= High school ice hockey in Missouri =

High school hockey in Missouri consists of two leagues centered around the two largest cities in the state, St. Louis and Kansas City, Missouri. The majority of the schools are located in the St. Louis metropolitan area and are members of the Mid-States Club Hockey Association (MSCHA), the larger of the two leagues in Missouri. Schools in the central, northwest, and southwest portions of Missouri are members of the Mid America High School Hockey League (MAHSHL). Vianney is the only Missouri school that currently participates in the Mississippi Valley Club Hockey Association (MVCHA), a league based primarily in the Metro East region of Illinois. MSCHA and MVCHA are the two leagues within the High School division of Missouri Hockey Inc. High school ice hockey in Missouri is not sanctioned by the Missouri State High School Activities Association (MSHSAA) but instead by USA Hockey.

== NHL alumni ==
Chaminade College Preparatory School

- Ben Bishop
- Chris Butler
- Paul Stastny
- Yan Stastny
- Brady Tkachuk
- Matthew Tkachuk
- Chris Wideman

Christian Brothers College (CBC)

- Cal Heeter
- Phil McRae
- Joe Vitale

De Smet Jesuit

- Jakub Dobes
- Trent Frederic

Eureka

- Cam Janssen

Francis Howell North

- Brandon Bollig

Ladue Horton Watkins

- Glenn Patrick

Oakville

- Chase Bradley
- Patrick Maroon

Parkway South

- Mike McKenna

Westminster Christian Academy

- Cole McWard
- Joseph Woll

Whitfield School

- Luke Kunin
- Ryan MacInnis

== Leagues ==
=== Mid-States Club Hockey Association (MSCHA) ===
The Mid-States Club Hockey Association (MSCHA) is the main high school hockey league in Missouri and is often referred to as Mid-States. The league is made up of teams in the St. Louis metropolitan area, currently all of which are located in Missouri. MSCHA is a non-profit corporation dedicated to the development of high school hockey.

==== History ====
Originally known as the Area High School Club Hockey League, MSCHA was founded in 1971 with significant seed money and sponsorship from Union Electric, as well as support from the St. Louis Blues, including the donation of the Challenge Cup for the league's winner and free use of the Arena for the final. At the time, organized youth hockey was experiencing a boom in the St. Louis area, mostly caused by the Blues' arrival and subsequent appearance in three Stanley Cup Finals. Eight teams contested that first season, with DeSmet winning the first championship. Of the eight teams that played that first year, only three can claim to have been in every Mid-States season: CBC, DeSmet, and SLUH. The league grew quickly, achieving a high of over 50 teams in its second year, when it also changed its name to the current MSCHA. It also experienced a high rate of attrition, as clubs were disbanded because of loss of players or removal of school support. Nevertheless, throughout the 1970s the league enjoyed considerable success. Plans were made for expansion to Kansas City and Columbia, but they were dropped following a dispute over travel costs and the loss of Columbia's ice rinks.

During the 1980s, the league went through several periods of change. A junior varsity league was established for younger players, and schools from new population centers such as West St. Louis County and St. Charles County joined. The playoff format was also changed after the 1984 season to the current system.

During the 1990s, the balance of power shifted from North County teams such as the Hazelwood Schools to newer West County sides, as well as those in St. Charles. In addition to new schools quickly forming teams, resulting in a brief experiment in tiered competition, several former clubs rejoined, including charter member Whitfield. Police presence at games was increased, alcohol was barred from the bleachers, and the league began to cooperate further with schools and encourage faculty and administrative presence at games to curb problems in student sections.

The new millennium presented MSCHA with a large set of opportunities. The St. Louis hockey scene was booming, with players such as the Stastny brothers Paul and Yan and goaltender Ben Bishop honing their NHL-bound skills on high school teams. The league had signed a television contract with local cable provider Charter Communications through its CCIN channel, allowing both league and playoff games, including finals, to be seen in homes around the area. However, a series of incidents cast a shadow on this success, including a Priory skater being concussed from a late hit against Affton, further brawls among fans, and a game in which a Zumwalt South player physically assaulted a referee, only to be struck back by the official. Two new postseason competitions were introduced, the Doug Wickenheiser Memorial Cup and Founders Cup, each for teams that finished lower on the league ladder.

==== League champions ====
At the conclusion of the regular season, the top seven ranked teams play in a traditional playoff format leading up to the Challenge Cup championship game. The next 16 ranked teams play a round-robin playoff for the Wickenheiser Memorial Cup. The remaining teams play in a traditional playoff format for the Founders Cup.

Challenge Cup	Wickenheiser Cup	Founders Cup
2026 – Chaminade (1); 2025 – DeSmet (16); 2024 – DeSmet (15); 2023 – DeSmet (14); 2022 – SLUH (4); 2021 – CBC (17); 2020 – Vianney (3); 2019 – SLUH (3); 2018 – SLUH (2); 2017 – CBC (16); 2016 – CBC (15); 2015 – CBC (14); 2014 – CBC (13); 2013 – SLUH (1); 2012 – CBC (12); 2011 – Francis Howell Central (1); 2010 – DeSmet (13); 2009 – CBC (11); 2008 – CBC (10); 2007 – CBC (9); 2006 – Oakville (1); 2005 – CBC (8); 2004 – CBC (7); 2003 – CBC (6); 2002 – DeSmet (12); 2001 – CBC (5); 2000 – DeSmet (11); 1999 – DeSmet (10); 1998 – DeSmet (9); 1997 – DeSmet (8); 1996 – Vianney (2); 1995 – Parkway South (2); 1994 – Parkway South (1); 1993 – CBC (4); 1992 – Parkway Central (1); 1991 – Kirkwood (5); 1990 – DeSmet (7); 1989 – DeSmet (6); 1988 – CBC (3); 1987 – CBC (2); 1986 – DeSmet (5); 1985 – DeSmet (4); 1984 – Hazelwood East (1); 1983 – CBC (1); 1982 – Kirkwood (4); 1981 – Kirkwood (3); 1980 – DeSmet (3); 1979 – Vianney (1); 1978 – DeSmet (2); 1977 – Lindbergh (1); 1976 – DeSmet (1); 1975 – Affton (1); 1974 – Kirkwood (2); 1973 – Kirkwood (1); 1972 – DeSmet (1)	2026 – Priory (4); 2025 – Parkway West (1); 2024 – Clayton (1); 2023 – Fort Zumwalt West (1); 2022 – Priory (3); 2021 – Ladue (2); 2020 – Duchesne (1); 2019 – Lafayette (2); 2018 – Westminster (2); 2017 – Westminster (1); 2016 – Marquette (1); 2015 – Francis Howell North (1); 2014 – Rockwood Summit (2); 2013 – Wentzville Holt (2); 2012 – Whitfield (2); 2011 – Wentzville Holt (1); 2010 – Oakville (1); 2009 – MICDS (1); 2008 – Whitfield (1); 2007 – Priory (2); 2006 – Lafayette (1); 2005 – John Burroughs (2); 2004 – Priory (1); 2003 – Althoff Catholic (Belleville, Illinois) (1); 2002 – Lindbergh (2); 2001 – Lindbergh (1); 2000 – Affton (1); 1999 – no Tier II championship; 1998 – no Tier II championship; 1997 – John Burroughs (1); 1996 – Rockwood Summit (1); 1995 – Hazelwood Central (1); 1994 – Ladue (1); 1993 – Granite City (Illinois) (1)	2026 – Wentzville Holt (2); 2025 – Fort Zumwalt East (1); 2024 – Wentzville Liberty (1); 2023 – Westminster (1); 2022 – Francis Howell Central (1); 2021 – Eureka (2); 2020 – Parkway South (1); 2019 – Eureka (1); 2018 – Whitfield (3); 2017 – Wentzville Holt (1); 2016 – John Burroughs (2); 2015 – John Burroughs (1); 2014 – Whitfield (2); 2013 – Mehlville (1); 2012 – Ladue (1); 2011 – Whitfield (1); 2010 – Wentzville Timberland (1); 2009 – Parkway West (1); 2008 – Parkway Central (1); 2007 – Saint Charles West (1)

==== Divisions ====
Central	Challenge	St. Charles	Suburban
Clayton; John Burroughs; Ladue; Lutheran South; MICDS; Northwest; Priory; Westminster	Chaminade; CBC; DeSmet; Eureka; Kirkwood; Lafayette; Marquette; Oakville; St. Dominic; SLUH; Vianney; Wentzville Liberty	Duchesne; Fort Zumwalt East; Fort Zumwalt North; Fort Zumwalt South; Fort Zumwalt West; Francis Howell; Francis Howell Central; Wentzville Holt; Wentzville North Point; Wentzville Timberland	Fox; Lindbergh; Parkway Central; Parkway South; Parkway West; Rockwood Summit; Seckman; Webster Groves

=== Mississippi Valley Club Hockey Association (MVCHA) ===
The Mississippi Valley Club Hockey Association (MVCHA) is a high school ice hockey league whose teams are based primarily in the Metro East region of Illinois. It is one of two leagues in the High School division of Missouri Hockey Inc., along with MSCHA. Vianney is the only Missouri school that currently participates in MVCHA, with a different team from the one it fields in MSCHA.

=== Mid America High School Hockey League (MAHSHL) ===
The Mid America High School Hockey League (MAHSHL) is made up of teams from northwest Arkansas; eastern and southern Kansas; central, northwest, and southwest Missouri; and Oklahoma. Established for the 2009–10 season, MAHSHL replaced the Kansas City Metro Area High School Hockey League (KCMAHSHL), which ceased operations after the 2008–09 season. MAHSHL differs from the Mid-States Club Hockey Association in that only one team is affiliated with a specific high school. The remaining teams are aligned with a group of school districts. A student-athlete must play for the team aligned with their attending school district. The league carries two divisions, varsity and junior varsity.

==== Teams ====
- Kansas City Icehawks (Kansas)
- Kansas City Knights
- Kansas City Fighting Saints
- Kansas City Stars (Kansas)
- Mid-Missouri Tigers
- Northwest Arkansas Ice Hogs (Arkansas)
- Rockhurst Hawklets
- Saint Joseph Griffons
- Springfield Spirit
- Wichita Jr Thunder (Kansas)

==== Former teams ====
The closure of numerous teams in the Kansas City area over a short period was primarily driven by the loss of all sheets of ice in the southern portion of the metropolitan area. The King Louie West Ice Chateau on Metcalf Avenue in Overland Park, Kansas, closed in 2007. In January 2011, Pepsi Ice Midwest on 135th Street in Overland Park also closed, resulting in the loss of the remaining three sheets of ice in the southern Kansas City area. With the loss of King Louie and Pepsi Ice Midwest, there were no longer conveniently located rinks for many of the high school teams that had once been part of the Kansas City Metro Area High School Hockey League.

- Blue Valley Tigers
- Blue Valley North Mustangs
- Blue Valley Northwest Huskies
- Blue Valley West Jaguars
- Carriage Club
- Des Moines Jr Buccaneers (Iowa)
- Jefferson City Capitals
- Jefferson City Eagles
- Kansas City Jr Mavs
- Lee's Summit/Shawnee Mission Storm
- Oak Park Northmen
- Oklahoma City Oil Kings
- Oklahoma Jr Warriors
- Olathe East Hawks
- Park Hill South Panthers
- Pembroke Hill Raiders
- Saint Pius X Warriors
- Saint Thomas Aquinas Saints
- Shawnee Mission East Lancers
- Shawnee Mission Northwest Cougars
- Shawnee Mission South Raiders
- Topeka
- Tulsa Flames
- Tulsa Jr Oilers
- Wichita Warriors

==== League champions ====
Season	Varsity Division	Junior Varsity Division
2025–26	Northwest Arkansas Ice Hogs	Northwest Arkansas Ice Hogs
2024–25	Kansas City Knights	Kansas City Knights JV1
2023–24	Wichita Jr Thunder	Northwest Arkansas Ice Hogs
2022–23	Wichita Jr Thunder	Mid-Missouri Tigers
2021–22	Wichita Jr Thunder	Tulsa Oilers
2020–21	Springfield Spirit	Carriage Club
2019–20	Carriage Club	Wichita Jr Thunder
2018–19	Springfield Spirit	Northwest Arkansas Ice Hogs
2017–18	Wichita Jr Thunder	St. Joseph Griffons
2016–17	Wichita Jr Thunder	Carriage Club
2015–16	Springfield Spirit	Wichita Warriors
2014–15	Springfield Spirit	Springfield Spirit
2013–14	Northwest Arkansas Ice Hogs	Mid-Missouri Tigers
2012–13	Rockhurst High School	Wichita Warriors
2011–12	Northwest Arkansas Ice Hogs	Wichita Warriors
2010–11	Springfield Spirit	Wichita Warriors
2009–10	Springfield Spirit	Wichita Warriors

==== All-Conference selections ====
During the 2020–21 season, the MAHSHL Board of Directors convened to hold its inaugural MAHSHL All-Conference selections. At the varsity level, each coach nominated players from their representative teams at each position (center, left and right wings, defensemen, and goaltenders), and the other coaches voted on those nominations to fill the 20 selections. No coach was allowed to vote for their own nominations.

Player selections by year:

All-Conference selections

2021:

Centers: Dominic Luevano (KC Saints), Tyler Caine (Springfield Spirit), Cody Hodgden (KC Stars [B]), Easton Norris (Wichita Jr Thunder)

Right wings: Gavin Loven (Springfield Spirit), Sean Hsu (NWA Ice Hogs), Luke Steiner (KC Stars [B]), Andrew Finn (Rockhurst Hawklets)

Left wings: Wyatt Wirth (Springfield Spirit), Luke Hsu (NWA Ice Hogs), Jack Przybylski (KC Stars [B]), Gavin Davis (KC Saints)

Defensemen: Darrell Smith (Wichita Jr Thunder), Nick Dannegger (Springfield Spirit), Henry Apostolakos (KC Saints), Noble Oxford (Rockhurst Hawklets), Charlie Zwillenberg (Carriage Club), John Brown (Springfield Spirit)

Goaltenders: Zane Lutzke (Springfield Spirit), Jake Phillips (OKC Oil Kings)

== See also ==
High school ice hockey in Illinois
