= Ben Bishop =

American ice hockey player (born 1986)

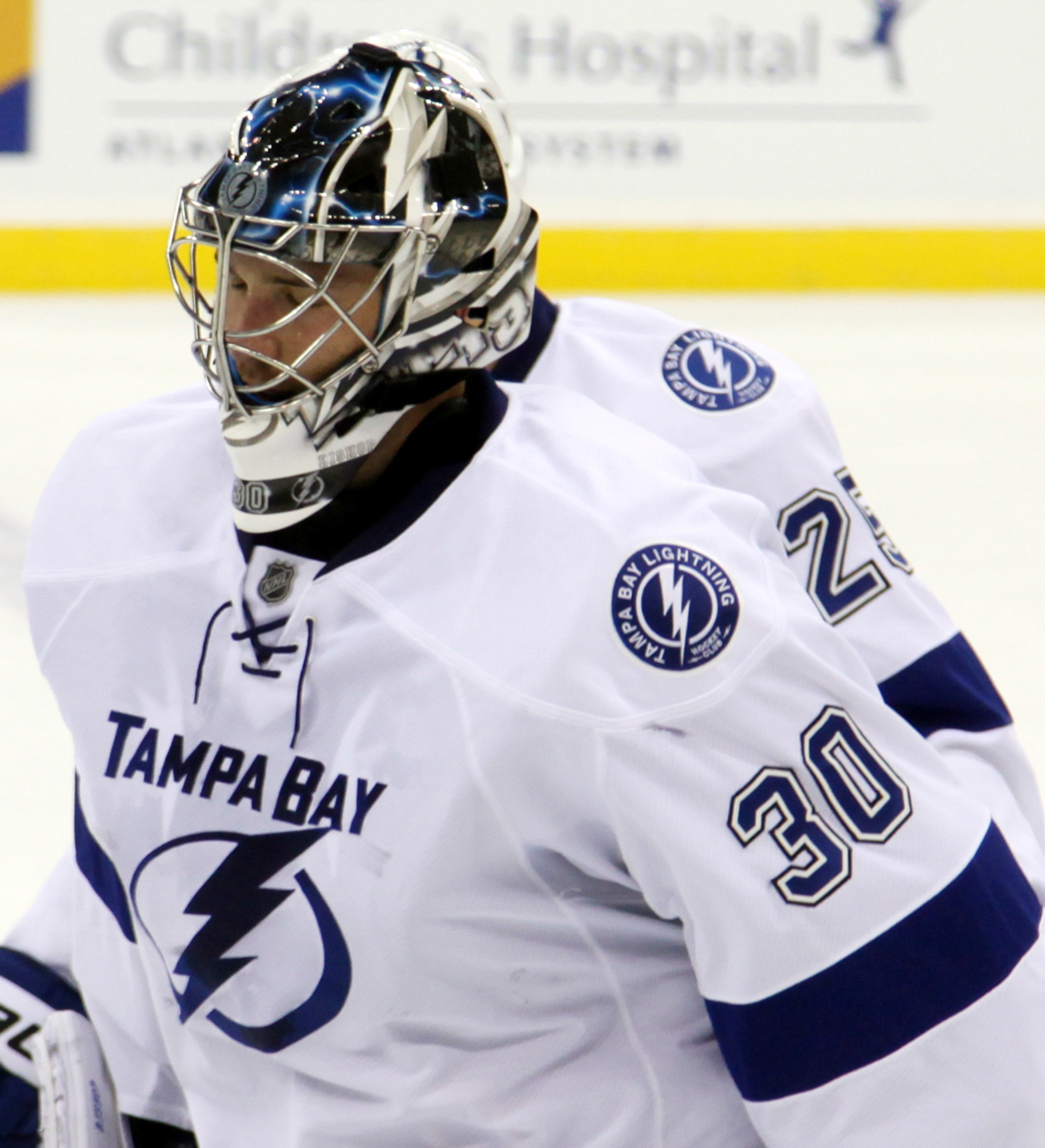
- Bishop with the Tampa Bay Lightning in October 2013
- Born: November 21, 1986 (age 39) Denver, Colorado, U.S.
- Height: 6 ft 7 in (201 cm)
- Weight: 225 lb (102 kg; 16 st 1 lb)
- Position: Goaltender
- Caught: Left
- Played for: St. Louis Blues; Ottawa Senators; Tampa Bay Lightning; Los Angeles Kings; Dallas Stars
- National team: United States
- NHL draft: 85th overall, 2005; St. Louis Blues
- Playing career: 2008–2021

Benjamin Manning Bishop III (born November 21, 1986) is an American former professional ice hockey player. As a goaltender, he played for the St. Louis Blues, Ottawa Senators, Tampa Bay Lightning, Los Angeles Kings, and Dallas Stars of the NHL. Nicknamed "Big Ben", Bishop is one of the tallest goaltenders ever to play in the NHL, along with Mikko Koskinen, Mads Søgaard, Ivan Fedotov, and Dennis Hildeby at a height of 6 ft 7 in (2.01 m). He was a three-time Vezina Trophy finalist as the NHL's top goaltender.

== Playing career ==
=== Early career ===
Although he was born in Denver, Colorado, Bishop grew up in suburban St. Louis where he played minor ice hockey for the Kirkwood Stars, as well as for the St. Louis Junior Blues. He played in the 2000 Quebec International Pee-Wee Hockey Tournament with the St. Louis Junior Blues. Bishop played forward until age eight, when he was converted to a goaltender. He attended Chaminade College Preparatory School in St. Louis, where he played high school hockey on the same team with Chris Butler and Paul Stastny. He later moved to Frisco, Texas, where he graduated from high school before attending the University of Maine.

Bishop played for the Texas Tornado of the North American Hockey League (NAHL) during the 2004–05 season. He appeared in 45 games and posted a league-best record of 35 wins (including 5 shutouts) and 8 losses. His goals against average (GAA) of 1.93 was second in the NAHL. Most notably, he led the Texas Tornado to their second consecutive National Championship. Bishop was named to the first team of the NAHL All-Rookie Team at the end of the season.

As a freshman for the University of Maine during the 2005–06 season, Bishop finished the regular season with a record of 21 wins, 8 losses and 2 ties with a 2.28 GAA. In his first game as a collegiate player, he lost in overtime to Colorado College in Colorado. The following weekend, Bishop led Maine to a sweep of the back-to-back national champions, the University of Denver. In October 2005 and February 2006, he was awarded Rookie of the Month as well as Goaltender of the Month by the NCAA's Hockey East conference. He was also named Rookie of the Week four separate times. Bishop led the Black Bears to the 2006 Frozen Four, losing to the University of Wisconsin–Madison in the semi-finals, despite playing strongly.

Bishop led the Black Bears to the Frozen Four once again in 2007, but lost to Michigan State University in the semi-finals, 4–2. As a junior in the 2007–08 NCAA Men's Division Hockey competition, Bishop played behind a less-than-stellar team, but had an impressive personal season performance, posting a 2.43 GAA and a .920 save percentage.

=== St. Louis Blues (2008–2012) ===
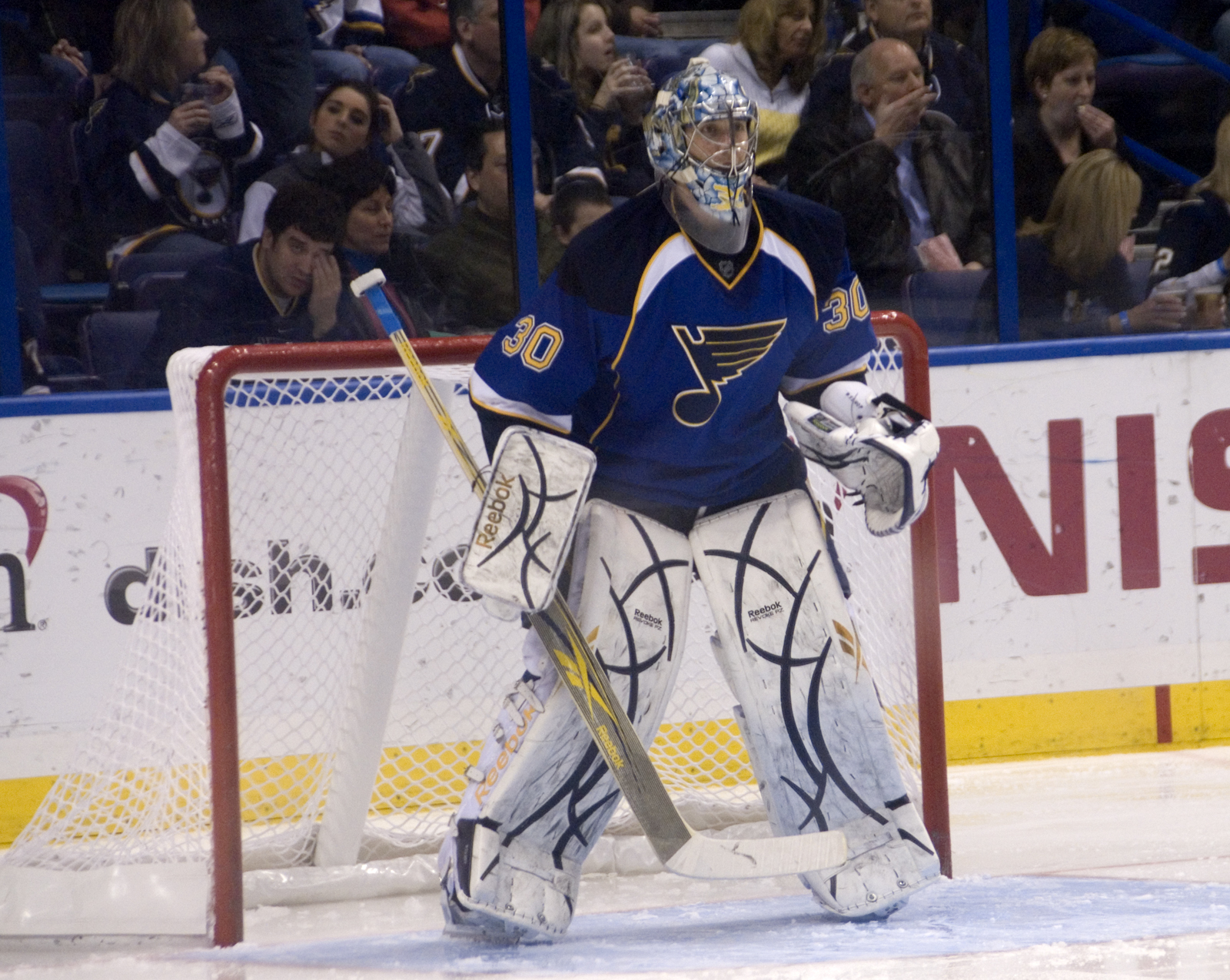
Bishop with the St. Louis Blues in February 2011

Bishop was drafted by the St. Louis Blues in the third round of the 2005 NHL entry draft, 85th overall, and became one of their top prospects. On March 11, 2008, it was announced he had signed with the Blues, where he would play the remainder of the season for their American Hockey League (AHL) affiliate, the Peoria Rivermen. In five games with Peoria, he posted a 2.39 GAA and received a fighting major in his second career game.

On October 19, 2008, it was announced Bishop was recalled from Peoria to join the Blues. On October 24, he made his NHL debut, coming off the bench in relief of the injured Manny Legace to start the second period, giving up two goals over the final 40 minutes in a 4–0 loss to the Los Angeles Kings. Bishop ultimately appeared in six games with the Blues in 2008–09 and was the back-up goaltender for all four of the team's playoff games that season in the first round sweep at the hands of the Vancouver Canucks.

After starting goaltender Jaroslav Halák was injured in the 2010–11 season, Bishop was called up from Peoria. In his third game played of the season, he would record his first NHL shutout, which came against the Edmonton Oilers at Rexall Place on February 25, 2011, stopping all 39 shots in a 5–0 win.

On July 5, 2011, Bishop signed a one-year contract with the Blues.

=== Ottawa Senators (2012–2013) ===
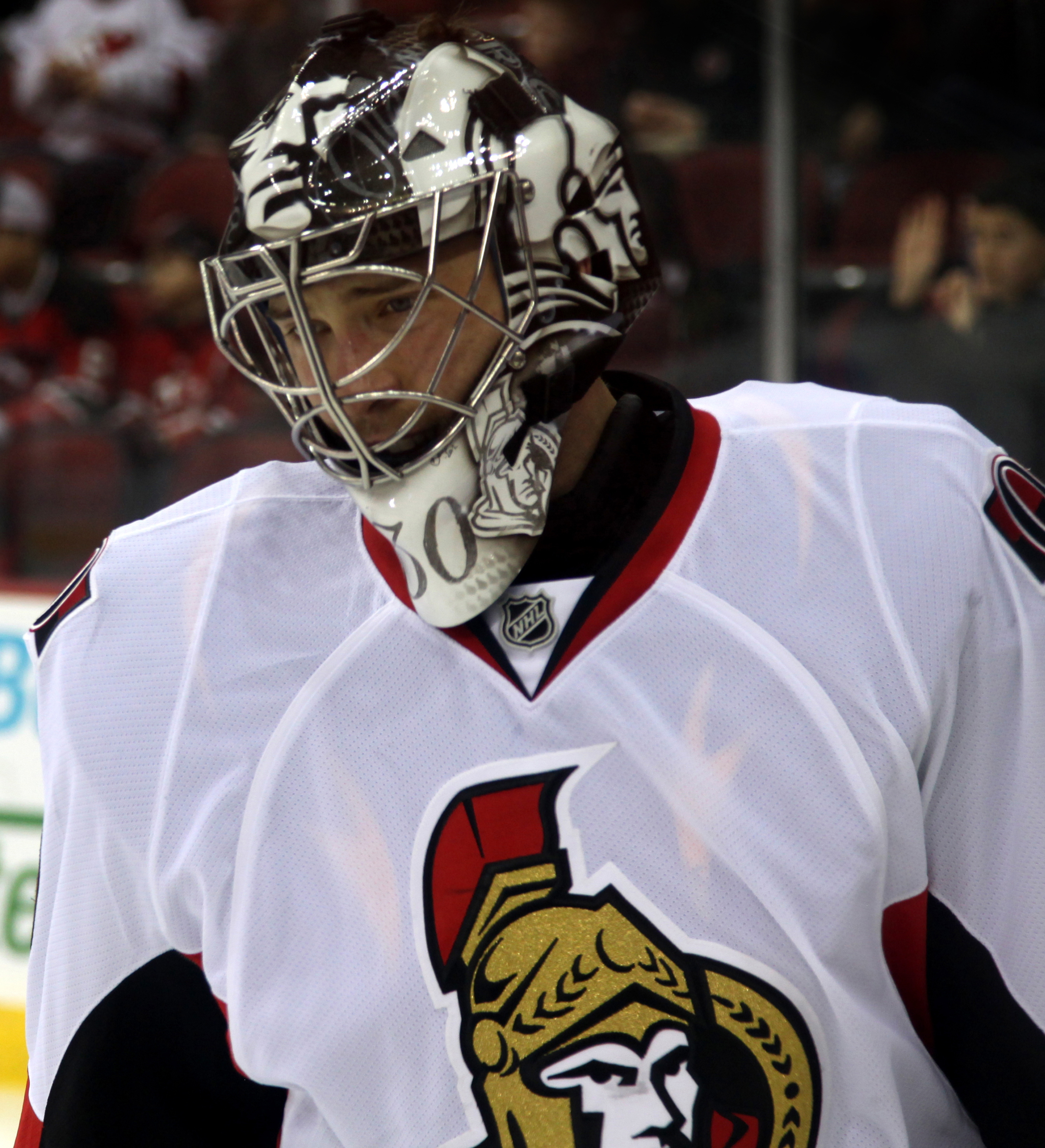
Bishop with the Ottawa Senators in February 2013

On February 26, 2012, Bishop was traded to the Ottawa Senators in exchange for a second-round pick in the 2013 NHL entry draft. A kitchen accident resulted in Senators' starting goaltender Craig Anderson being injured indefinitely with a hand laceration, a situation that may have hastened Bishop's move to Ottawa. At the time of the trade, Bishop was the AHL's top goaltender with a 24–14–0 record, a 2.26 GAA, a .928 save percentage and an AHL-leading six shutouts through 38 games. Bishop made his Senators debut against the Tampa Bay Lightning on March 6, 2012, in a game which Ottawa won 7–3. He earned his second win in as many starts in a 4–1 win over the New York Rangers. He finished the season with a 3–3–2 record and 2.48 GAA in ten games played with Ottawa.

Due to the 2012–13 NHL lockout, Bishop began the 2012–13 season in the AHL with the Binghamton Senators, where he posted an 8–3–2 record and 2.59 GAA in 13 games. Once the lockout was resolved, he was called up to Ottawa to serve as backup to Craig Anderson. His first game of the NHL season was less than memorable for Bishop, as he surrendered five goals on 30 shots in a loss to Tampa Bay. However, his play improved as he was named the NHL's Third Star of the Week on February 25, 2013, after posting a 2.03 GAA and .931 save percentage, as Ottawa won all four of its games.

=== Tampa Bay Lightning (2013–2017) ===
On April 3, 2013, Bishop was traded at the 2012–13 NHL trade deadline by the Senators to the Tampa Bay Lightning in exchange for forward Cory Conacher and a fourth-round draft pick. On April 4, Bishop made his Lightning debut, shutting out the Carolina Hurricanes 5–0 in Raleigh, North Carolina. On April 15, Bishop signed a two-year, $4.6 million contract extension with the Lightning. Bishop set a career high and Tampa Bay franchise record on January 19, 2014, by making 48 saves in another victory over Carolina.

During the 2013–14 season, Bishop was named the starting goaltender for Tampa Bay over Anders Lindbäck. Bishop posted a 37–14–7 record last in the 63 games played that season. He also recorded a .924 save percentage and a 2.23 GAA. Bishop was ranked fourth in games played, as well as seventh in save percentage and goals against. He posted five shutouts, which was the second most in Lightning history, and also set single-season records for wins, save percentage and GAA. He recorded the second-most saves in Lightning history, with 1,625. Bishop was nominated for the Vezina Trophy—NHL's top goaltender—for the season due to his stellar play in net, though he ultimately finished third in voting. During a game against the Toronto Maple Leafs on April 8, 2014, he fell awkwardly on his left leg. He had to be helped off the ice that would end his 2013–14 season, as Tampa Bay were swept out of the first round of the 2014 Stanley Cup playoffs by the Montreal Canadiens.

On August 2, 2014, the Lightning announced Bishop's contract had been extended for two years. On March 30, 2015, Bishop became the first Lightning goalie to record two assists in one game. On April 4, 2015, Bishop earned his 38th win of the season in a 4–0 shutout of the Florida Panthers, which was a personal best and surpassed the Tampa Bay franchise record he set the previous season. On April 11, 2015, Bishop extended his personal best and team record to 40 wins in a 3–2 Lightning shootout win over the visiting Boston Bruins. On April 18, 2015, Bishop made his Stanley Cup playoff debut—and earned his first career playoff win—in a 5–1 victory over the Detroit Red Wings. On May 29, 2015, Bishop joined Tim Thomas and Patrick Roy as the only goaltenders to post shutouts in two seventh games in a single playoff year. Bishop also became the first goaltender to post two shutouts in two seventh games in his first season in the playoffs. Additionally, Bishop became the first goaltender to win back-to-back playoff shutouts in Madison Square Garden, which would cause the New York Rangers to lose their first game seven at home in their franchise's history. After losing to the Chicago Blackhawks in six games in the 2015 Stanley Cup Finals, Bishop revealed he tore his groin on a Brad Richards shot in the second period of game two. The injury did not require surgery, just rest during the off-season.

On October 17, 2015, Bishop became the all-time leader in regular season wins for the Tampa Bay Lightning, posting his 84th win in a 2–1 victory over the visiting Buffalo Sabres. In doing so, he surpassed former Lightning goaltender Nikolai Khabibulin's record of 83 regular season wins. On October 23, 2015, Bishop won his 100th career NHL game in a 4–3 Lightning victory in overtime over the Winnipeg Jets. On January 6, 2016, Bishop was named to the 2016 NHL All-Star Game, his first career All-Star appearance. Bishop also became the second Lightning goaltender selected to an All-Star Game in team history. On February 3, 2016, Bishop recorded his 100th win for the Lightning in a 3–1 win over the visiting Detroit Red Wings. Bishop also became the first Lightning goalie to record 100 wins in franchise history with the victory. On March 19, 2016, Bishop posted his 15th career shutout in a Lightning uniform. This shutout moved Bishop past Nikolai Khabibulin for the most shutouts in franchise history. On April 27, 2016, Bishop was named one of the three finalists for the Vezina Trophy. Bishop led the NHL with a 2.06 GAA and posted a 35–21 record with a .926 save percentage. Braden Holtby and Jonathan Quick were the other finalists named. This was Bishop's second time being a finalist for the Vezina. Bishop finished as runner-up in the Vezina Trophy and was named to the NHL second All-Star team.

On October 13, 2016, Bishop became the Lightning's all-time leader in saves (4,963), surpassing Daren Puppa (4,959). The record came during a 6–4 win over the visiting Detroit Red Wings. On October 25, 2016, Bishop's two front teeth were knocked out by the Toronto Maple Leafs' Peter Holland on a shot to his mask. Bishop, stunned, shook his head, causing his teeth to fall out into his mask. On November 17, 2016, Bishop played in 207th game for the Lightning, surpassing Daren Puppa for most games played by a goaltender in Lightning history.

=== Los Angeles Kings (2017) ===
During the 2016 off-season, rumors built up about the Lightning's intention to trade Bishop due to salary cap restraints for Tampa Bay and the impending 2017 NHL expansion draft, as Bishop was entering the final year of his contract and set to become an unrestricted free agent the following summer. After a deal with the Calgary Flames involving a contract extension fell through, Bishop began the 2016–17 season with Tampa Bay.

As the Lightning dealt with lingering salary cap space concerns sitting outside of a playoff spot, Bishop was traded three days before the NHL trade deadline on February 26, 2017, to the Los Angeles Kings in exchange for goaltender Peter Budaj, defenseman Erik Černák, a 2017 NHL entry draft seventh-round pick and a conditional second-round pick in 2017. Bishop made his debut with Los Angeles on February 28, a 2–1 overtime loss in which he stopped 28 of 30 shots and was awarded the game's third star. Acquired by the Kings to back-up Jonathan Quick (who was just coming off an injury in which he missed most of the season) and to bolster the team's chances of making the playoffs, Bishop appeared in seven games with the club, but was unable to help the squad to a playoff appearance.

=== Dallas Stars (2017–2021) ===
On May 9, 2017, the Kings traded Bishop's expiring contract and negotiating rights to the Dallas Stars in exchange for a fourth-round pick in the 2017 NHL entry draft, which Dallas had previously acquired from the Montreal Canadiens. On May 12, 2017, it was announced via the Dallas Stars official Twitter account that the Stars and Bishop agreed to a six-year contract worth about $29.5 million.

On March 14, 2019, in a game against the Minnesota Wild, Bishop broke Ed Belfour's franchise record for longest shutout streak before being pulled due to a lower body injury. At that time, Bishop ranked second in the league in goals against and first in save percentage. The Stars later announced Bishop was day-to-day.

In the 2019–20 season, Bishop was able to reach his second career Stanley Cup Finals appearance, and first with the Dallas Stars, albeit deemed "unfit to play" throughout the majority of the playoffs. In the three playoff games he played, he struggled mightily, posting an .844 save percentage and a 5.41 goals against average. The Stars would lose 4–2 to the Tampa Bay Lightning, his former team.

The Stars announced Bishop would be out five months following surgery to repair a torn meniscus in his right knee. On April 14, 2021, the Stars announced that Bishop would be ruled out for the rest of the COVID-19 pandemic shortened 2020–21 season.

Still hoping to continue his professional career, Bishop continued his rehabilitation into the 2021–22 season. Starting the season on the injured reserve, Bishop later accepted a conditioning assignment to AHL affiliate, the Texas Stars. After letting in 8 goals in a 8–4 defeat to the Chicago Wolves, Bishop was returned to Dallas' long-term injury reserve list and effectively signalled his retirement from professional hockey, later confirmed by Stars general manager Jim Nill due to having a degenerative knee injury on December 11, 2021. On June 10, 2022, Bishop's contract along with a seventh-round draft pick in 2022 were traded to the Buffalo Sabres in exchange for future considerations.

== International play ==
Medal record

Men's ice hockey

Representing United States

World Championships
Bronze medal – third place	2013 Stockholm/Helsinki	

On March 2, 2016, Team USA named Bishop to its roster for the 2016 World Cup of Hockey. The tournament ran from September 17 to October 1, 2016, in Toronto.

== Personal life ==
Bishop was born to Ben Bishop Jr. and Cindy Bishop. His grandfather, Ben Bishop Sr., was a professional tennis player who played in the US Open.

Bishop attended Chaminade High School, which retired his jersey number. Later he moved to Frisco, Texas, where he graduated from Frisco High School.

Bishop and his wife, Andrea, have two sons (Benjamin Manning Bishop IV, James Andrew Bishop).

== Career statistics ==
=== Regular season and playoffs ===
			Regular season									Playoffs
Season	Team	League	GP	W	L	OTL	MIN	GA	SO	GAA	SV%	GP	W	L	MIN	GA	SO	GAA	SV%
2004–05	Texas Tornado	NAHL	45	35	8	2	2577	83	5	1.93	.920	11	9	2	660	30	0	2.73	.891
2005–06	University of Maine	HE	31	21	7	2	1728	64	0	2.22	.908	—	—	—	—	—	—	—	—
2006–07	University of Maine	HE	34	21	9	2	1907	68	3	2.14	.923	—	—	—	—	—	—	—	—
2007–08	University of Maine	HE	34	13	18	3	1972	80	2	2.43	.920	—	—	—	—	—	—	—	—
2007–08	Peoria Rivermen	AHL	5	2	2	1	302	12	0	2.38	.908	—	—	—	—	—	—	—	—
2008–09	Peoria Rivermen	AHL	33	15	16	1	1898	89	1	2.81	.897	—	—	—	—	—	—	—	—
2008–09	St. Louis Blues	NHL	6	1	1	1	245	12	1	2.94	.893	—	—	—	—	—	—	—	—
2009–10	Peoria Rivermen	AHL	48	23	18	4	2793	129	0	2.77	.901	—	—	—	—	—	—	—	—
2010–11	Peoria Rivermen	AHL	35	17	14	2	2043	87	2	2.55	.914	1	0	1	59	2	0	2.04	.895
2010–11	St. Louis Blues	NHL	7	3	4	0	369	17	1	2.76	.899	—	—	—	—	—	—	—	—
2011–12	Peoria Rivermen	AHL	38	24	14	0	2258	85	6	2.26	.928	—	—	—	—	—	—	—	—
2011–12	Binghamton Senators	AHL	3	2	1	0	179	7	0	2.35	.944	—	—	—	—	—	—	—	—
2011–12	Ottawa Senators	NHL	10	3	3	2	532	22	0	2.48	.909	—	—	—	—	—	—	—	—
2012–13	Binghamton Senators	AHL	13	8	3	2	787	34	0	2.59	.928	—	—	—	—	—	—	—	—
2012–13	Ottawa Senators	NHL	13	8	5	0	758	31	1	2.45	.922	—	—	—	—	—	—	—	—
2012–13	Tampa Bay Lightning	NHL	9	3	4	1	502	25	1	2.99	.917	—	—	—	—	—	—	—	—
2013–14	Tampa Bay Lightning	NHL	63	37	14	7	3586	133	5	2.23	.924	—	—	—	—	—	—	—	—
2014–15	Tampa Bay Lightning	NHL	62	40	13	5	3519	136	4	2.32	.916	25	13	11	1459	53	3	2.18	.921
2015–16	Tampa Bay Lightning	NHL	61	35	21	4	3585	123	6	2.06	.926	11	8	2	582	18	2	1.86	.939
2016–17	Tampa Bay Lightning	NHL	32	16	12	3	1813	77	1	2.55	.911	—	—	—	—	—	—	—	—
2016–17	Los Angeles Kings	NHL	7	2	3	2	412	17	0	2.49	.900	—	—	—	—	—	—	—	—
2017–18	Dallas Stars	NHL	53	26	17	5	2887	120	5	2.49	.916	—	—	—	—	—	—	—	—
2018–19	Dallas Stars	NHL	46	27	15	2	2638	87	7	1.98	.934	13	7	6	811	30	0	2.22	.933
2019–20	Dallas Stars	NHL	44	21	16	4	2474	103	2	2.50	.920	3	1	2	133	12	0	5.41	.844
2021–22	Texas Stars	AHL	1	0	1	0	59	8	0	8.20	.765	—	—	—	—	—	—	—	—
NHL totals			413	222	128	36	23,317	903	33	2.32	.921	52	29	21	2,985	113	5	2.27	.924

=== International ===
Year	Team	Event	Result	GP	W	L	T	MIN	GA	SO	GAA	SV%
2010	United States	WC	13th	1	0	0	0	20	0	0	0.00	1.000
2013	United States	WC	3rd place, bronze medalist(s)	5	3	2	0	297	14	0	2.83	.876
2016	United States	WCH	7th	1	0	1	0	40	4	0	6.00	.800
Senior totals				7	3	3	0	357	18	0	3.03	.870

== Awards and honors ==
Award	Year
NAHL
All-Star Game	2005
All-Rookie Team	2005
Champions (Texas Tornado)	2005
College
HE All-Rookie Team	2006
HE All-Academic Team	2007, 2008
HE All-Second Team	2008
AHL
All-Star Game	2012
Second All-Star team	2012
NHL
All-Star Game	2016
Second All-Star team	2016, 2019
