= High school ice hockey in Illinois =

High school ice hockey in Illinois is administered primarily by the Amateur Hockey Association of Illinois (AHAI), the Illinois affiliate of USA Hockey. Most Illinois high school hockey programs compete in leagues listed by AHAI, while some programs participate in other leagues, including the Mississippi Valley Club Hockey Association (MVCHA) and the Midwest Prep Hockey League (MPHL).

Illinois high school hockey is concentrated in the Chicago metropolitan area, although teams also compete elsewhere in the state. AHAI currently lists six high school hockey leagues. Teams are classified as either pure teams, consisting entirely of players from a single high school, or combined teams, which bring together players from multiple schools. Most programs offer both varsity and junior varsity teams.

== Organization ==
AHAI's High School Committee establishes and administers rules and regulations for high school hockey and provides guidance on matters such as eligibility and participation.

AHAI currently lists six high school hockey leagues:

- Scholastic Hockey League (SHL)
- IHSHL North Central Division (IHSHL-NC)
- Illinois West High School Hockey League
- Chicago Catholic Hockey League (CCHL)
- Metro Girls High School Hockey League
- Lincoln Land Prep Hockey League (LLPHL)

The Scholastic Hockey League consists of pure high school clubs and operates varsity, junior varsity, and Academic divisions. The IHSHL North Central Division includes both pure and combined programs and is the largest of the six leagues. Illinois West includes both pure and combined teams, while the Chicago Catholic Hockey League consists of Catholic high school programs. The Lincoln Land Prep Hockey League serves central and southern Illinois. The Metro Girls High School Hockey League provides league competition for girls' high school hockey.

The Mississippi Valley Club Hockey Association (MVCHA) is an Illinois high school hockey league and one of two leagues in the High School division of Missouri Hockey Inc. Its teams are located primarily in the Metro East region, with Vianney the only current member in Missouri.

Some Illinois schools also compete in leagues outside those administered by AHAI and Missouri Hockey Inc. Lake Forest Academy competes in the Midwest Prep Hockey League (MPHL), which has member schools in the United States and Canada.

== State championships ==
AHAI conducts an annual Illinois High School Hockey State Championship, with separate varsity and junior varsity divisions for pure and combined teams. The Mississippi Valley Club Hockey Association (MVCHA) also conducts its own playoffs, with separate Class 1A and Class 2A competitions leading to championship series.

The AHAI varsity divisions include Varsity Red, for pure teams, and Varsity Combined, for combined teams. The junior varsity divisions include JV Blue, for pure teams, and JV Combined, for combined teams. AHAI also lists a Downstate bracket. The state tournament uses a single-elimination format.

AHAI maintains an archive of Illinois state hockey champions dating to 1984, including records for high school competition.

=== 2026 championships ===
In 2026, Saint Viator won the Varsity Red championship, defeating New Trier 6–3 at Allstate Arena in Rosemont. It was Saint Viator's first Illinois high school hockey state championship.

BG/H/W won the Varsity Combined championship. The program represents Buffalo Grove, John Hersey, and Wheeling.

In the MVCHA, Edwardsville won the Class 2A championship, defeating Belleville in the championship series to secure its third consecutive title.

== Girls' high school hockey ==
Girls' high school hockey is organized separately from the boys' high school leagues. AHAI lists the Metro Girls High School Hockey League among its high school leagues and also conducts a separate Illinois High School Girls State Championship.

The girls' state championship is a single-elimination tournament for girls' high school teams from throughout Illinois. In 2026, the championship game was played at Allstate Arena.

== Notable players ==
Several former Illinois high school hockey players have gone on to play in the National Hockey League (NHL). Notable examples include:

- Bates Battaglia – Fenwick
- Joe Corvo – Fenwick
- Alex DeBrincat – Lake Forest Academy
- Eddie Olczyk – Brother Rice

== See also ==
- High school ice hockey in Missouri
