= Yan Stastny =

Canadian ice hockey player

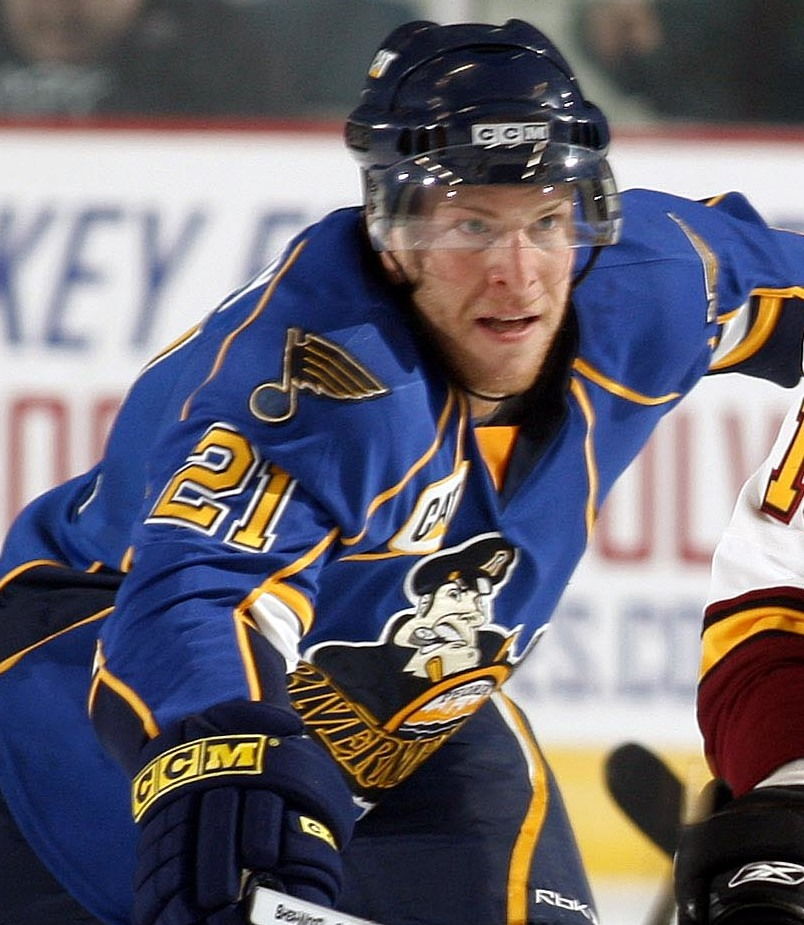
- Stastny with the Peoria Rivermen in 2007
- Born: September 30, 1982 (age 43) Quebec City, Quebec, Canada
- Height: 5 ft 10 in (178 cm)
- Weight: 191 lb (87 kg; 13 st 9 lb)
- Position: Centre
- Shot: Left
- Played for: Nürnberg Ice Tigers; Edmonton Oilers; Boston Bruins; St. Louis Blues; HC CSKA Moscow; Schwenninger Wild Wings; HC Vítkovice Ridera; EHC Lustenau
- National team: United States
- NHL draft: 259th overall, 2002; Boston Bruins
- Playing career: 2005–2018

Yan Pavol Stastny (born September 30, 1982) is a Canadian-American former professional ice hockey centre. He comes from the Slovak Stastny ice hockey family, and is the son of Hockey Hall of Famer Peter Šťastný (one of the first star Eastern Bloc players to defect to the West). His uncles Anton and Marián Šťastný also played in the National Hockey League (NHL), and his brother Paul Stastny.

== Early life ==
Yan Stastny was born in Quebec City, but he moved to New Jersey and then to St. Louis at the age of 7 when his father joined the St. Louis Blues, and where he and his siblings were raised. As a youth, he played in the 1996 Quebec International Pee-Wee Hockey Tournament with the St. Louis Blues minor ice hockey team.

He played high school ice hockey for Chaminade College Preparatory School for two years, and then transferred to Parkway Central High School, because Chaminade would not let him miss classes to play junior ice hockey. During his final years of high school, he played for the Junior B St. Louis Jr. Blues and then the Junior A St. Louis Sting.

Yan's number 26 was retired by Chaminade College Preparatory School in honor of Yan and his brother Paul in August 2018.

== Playing career ==
=== Amateur ===
Stastny played for the Omaha Lancers, a Junior A team in the United States Hockey League (USHL) during the 2000–01 season. He helped them win the Clark Cup playoff trophy and the Gold Cup National Championship over the Texas Tornado. After high school, he attended the University of Notre Dame for two years where he played for the Fighting Irish before being drafted into the NHL.

=== Professional ===
Stastny was drafted in the eighth round (259th overall) in the 2002 NHL entry draft. He played for Team USA in the 2005 IIHF World Championship, making the Stastnys the first ice hockey family known to have represented four different countries in international play (his father played for Czechoslovakia and Canada in the Canada Cup series in 1976 and 1984, and for Slovakia after the dissolution of Czechoslovakia).

After playing 51 games of the 2005–06 season with the American Hockey League (AHL)'s Iowa Stars, Stastny made his NHL debut on March 1, 2006, with the Edmonton Oilers against the St. Louis Blues, the last team for which his father played. Eight days later, he was traded by the Oilers back to the Boston Bruins along with Marty Reasoner and a 2006 second round pick (Milan Lucic) for Sergei Samsonov as part of an NHL trade deadline deal. He scored his first NHL goal for Boston in a 4-3 home loss against the Montreal Canadiens on April 13, 2006. On January 16, 2007, the Boston Bruins traded him to the St. Louis Blues for a 2007 fifth round draft pick.

On March 3, 2010, the Blues traded him to the Vancouver Canucks for Pierre-Cédric Labrie. He never appeared with the Canucks, instead playing with AHL affiliate, the Manitoba Moose, to conclude the 2009–10 season. On June 29, 2010, Stastny joined CSKA Moscow of the Kontinental Hockey League (KHL).

After a season with Mora IK in the HockeyAllsvenskan, Stastny returned to the German Deutsche Eishockey Liga (DEL), signing an initial try-out contract with the Schwenninger Wild Wings on August 2, 2015. He later secured a one-year deal on August 31.

As a free agent the following off-season, Stastny returned to North America after six European seasons, agreeing to a professional try-out contract to attend the training camp with his former club, the St. Louis Blues, joining his brother Paul, on September 10, 2016.

After Stastny failed to make the Blues he signed with HC Vítkovice Ridera of the Czech Extraliga (ELH) in October 2016. For the 2017–18 season, Stastny signed with EHC Lustenau of the Alps Hockey League and set a career high in goals with 25. He has not signed with a team since.

== Career statistics ==
=== Regular season and playoffs ===
			Regular season					Playoffs
Season	Team	League	GP	G	A	Pts	PIM	GP	G	A	Pts	PIM
1998–99	St. Louis Jr. Blues	CSHL
1999–2000	St. Louis Sting	NAHL	45	12	23	35	77	—	—	—	—	—
2000–01	St. Louis Sting	NAHL	6	0	2	2	23	—	—	—	—	—
2000–01	Omaha Lancers	USHL	44	17	14	31	101	11	6	6	12	12
2001–02	University of Notre Dame	CCHA	33	6	11	17	38	—	—	—	—	—
2002–03	University of Notre Dame	CCHA	39	14	9	23	44	—	—	—	—	—
2003–04	Nürnberg Ice Tigers	DEL	44	9	20	29	83	6	0	1	1	6
2004–05	Nürnberg Ice Tigers	DEL	51	24	30	54	60	6	2	1	3	8
2005–06	Iowa Stars	AHL	51	14	17	31	42	—	—	—	—	—
2005–06	Edmonton Oilers	NHL	3	0	0	0	0	—	—	—	—	—
2005–06	Boston Bruins	NHL	17	1	3	4	10	—	—	—	—	—
2005–06	Providence Bruins	AHL	—	—	—	—	—	6	0	5	5	12
2006–07	Boston Bruins	NHL	21	0	2	2	19	—	—	—	—	—
2006–07	Providence Bruins	AHL	11	3	9	12	12	—	—	—	—	—
2006–07	Peoria Rivermen	AHL	39	11	17	28	35	—	—	—	—	—
2007–08	Peoria Rivermen	AHL	43	13	11	24	69	—	—	—	—	—
2007–08	St. Louis Blues	NHL	12	1	1	2	9	—	—	—	—	—
2008–09	St. Louis Blues	NHL	34	3	4	7	20	—	—	—	—	—
2008–09	Peoria Rivermen	AHL	30	12	7	19	21	6	2	2	4	2
2009–10	Peoria Rivermen	AHL	49	10	17	27	51	—	—	—	—	—
2009–10	St. Louis Blues	NHL	4	1	0	1	0	—	—	—	—	—
2009–10	Manitoba Moose	AHL	16	2	4	6	18	6	2	2	4	8
2010–11	CSKA Moscow	KHL	49	5	8	13	52	—	—	—	—	—
2011–12	Thomas Sabo Ice Tigers	DEL	40	14	21	35	92	—	—	—	—	—
2012–13	Thomas Sabo Ice Tigers	DEL	42	16	17	33	83	3	1	4	5	2
2013–14	Thomas Sabo Ice Tigers	DEL	28	9	13	22	44	4	1	0	1	8
2014–15	Mora IK	Allsv	23	1	4	5	12	—	—	—	—	—
2015–16	Schwenninger Wild Wings	DEL	38	10	10	20	10	—	—	—	—	—
2016–17	HC Vítkovice Ridera	ELH	37	7	7	14	26	5	0	0	0	0
2017–18	EHC Lustenau	AlpsHL	39	25	28	53	22	—	—	—	—	—
DEL totals			243	82	111	193	372	19	4	6	10	24
AHL totals			239	65	82	147	248	18	4	9	13	22
NHL totals			91	6	10	16	58	—	—	—	—	—

=== International ===
Year	Team	Event	Result	GP	G	A	Pts	PIM
2005	United States	WC	6th	7	2	0	2	6
2006	United States	WC	7th	7	1	0	1	2
2011	United States	WC	8th	7	1	1	2	4
Senior totals				21	4	1	5	12

== See also ==
- Notable families in the NHL
