= Chris Wideman =

American ice hockey player (born 1990)

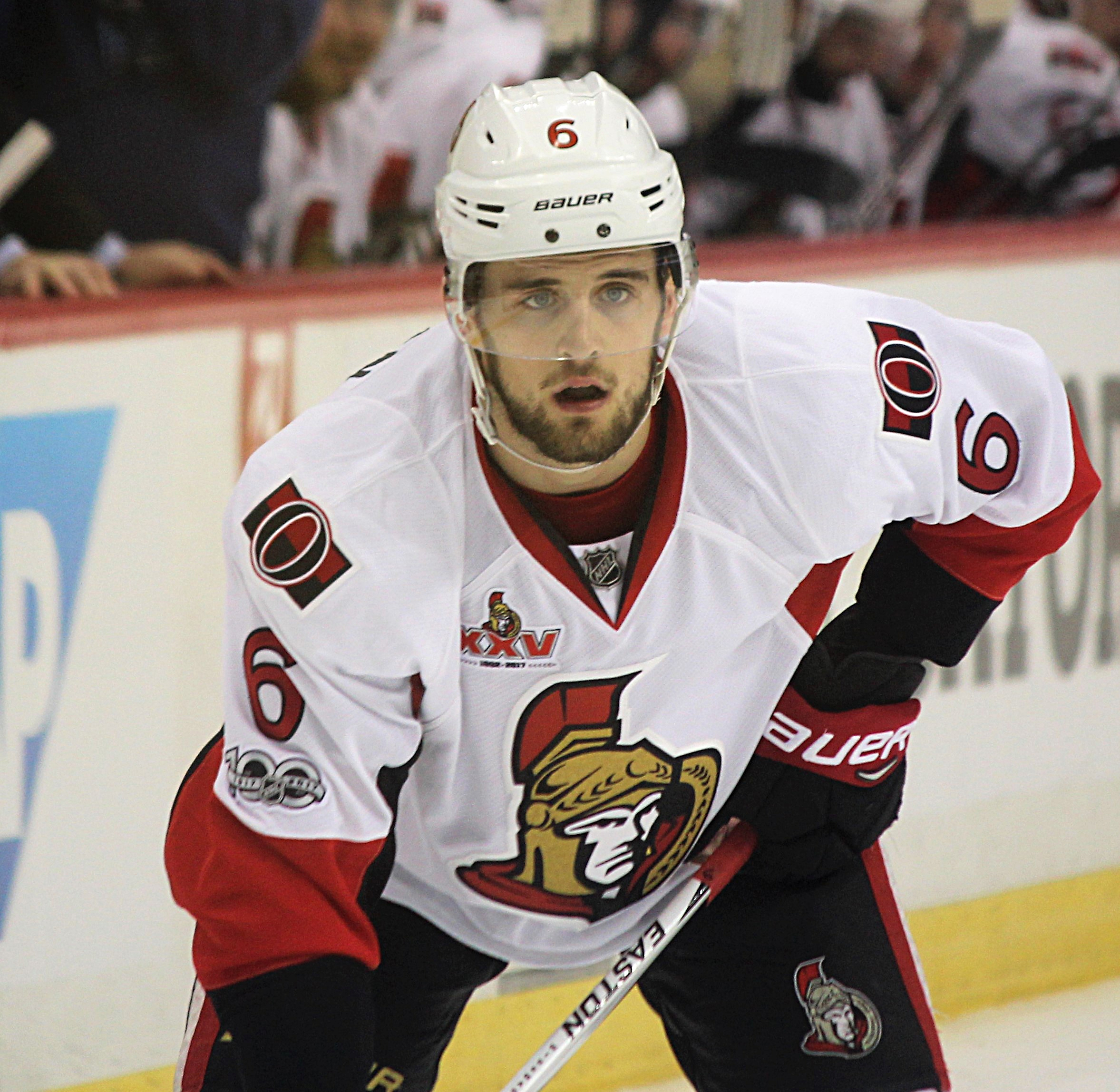
- Wideman with the Ottawa Senators in 2017
- Born: January 7, 1990 (age 36) St. Louis, Missouri, U.S.
- Height: 5 ft 10 in (178 cm)
- Weight: 183 lb (83 kg; 13 st 1 lb)
- Position: Defense
- Shot: Right
- Played for: Ottawa Senators; Edmonton Oilers; Florida Panthers; Torpedo Nizhny Novgorod; Montreal Canadiens
- National team: United States
- NHL draft: 100th overall, 2009; Ottawa Senators
- Playing career: 2012–2023

Chris Wideman (born January 7, 1990) is an American former professional ice hockey defenseman. He was selected in the fourth round, 100th overall, by the Ottawa Senators in the 2009 NHL entry draft. Wideman played for the Senators, Edmonton Oilers, Florida Panthers, and Montreal Canadiens in the National Hockey League (NHL), as well as Torpedo Nizhny Novgorod in the Kontinental Hockey League (KHL).

== Playing career ==
=== Amateur ===
Wideman was born in St. Louis, Missouri. As a youth, he played in the 2003 Quebec International Pee-Wee Hockey Tournament with the St. Louis Jr. Blues minor ice hockey team.

Wideman played high school hockey for Chaminade College Preparatory School. In 2007, Wideman joined the Cedar Rapids RoughRiders of the United States Hockey League where he played one year of Tier I junior hockey before entering Miami University in 2008. After one season at Miami, Wideman was drafted in the fourth round, 100th overall by the Ottawa Senators in the 2009 NHL entry draft. During his four-year stint in Miami, he helped the RedHawks earn their first two Frozen Four appearances, a national championship game appearance, and their first CCHA tournament title.

=== Professional ===
==== Ottawa Senators ====
On March 28, 2012, the Senators signed Wideman to a two-year, entry-level contract. After graduating from Miami, he joined the Senators' American Hockey League (AHL) affiliate, the Binghamton Senators, for the 2012–13 season. In his first professional season, Wideman scored two goals and 18 points in 60 games. He also skated in five games for the Elmira Jackals of the ECHL. Wideman played another two full seasons with Binghamton, and had a career-year during the 2014–15 season. He played in the 2015 AHL All-Star Classic as the team's lone representative. After recording 19 goals and 61 points in 75 games, he was named to the AHL's First All-Star Team and was awarded the Eddie Shore Award as the league's best defenseman. On June 29, 2015, the Senators re-signed Wideman to a one-year, two-way contract worth $600,000.

He was initially assigned to Binghamton to start the 2015–16 season. He was recalled in early October and was a healthy scratch for five games before making his NHL debut on October 17, 2015, against the Nashville Predators after defenseman Marc Methot missed the game with an illness. He was paired with Jared Cowen in his debut. On November 7, in his fourth game, Wideman scored his first NHL goal against goaltender Cam Ward in a 3–2 overtime loss to the Carolina Hurricanes.

During the 2017–18 season, Wideman underwent surgery to repair a hamstring injury, ending his season. Despite this, Wideman signed a one-year contract extension with the Senators on June 24, 2018. During the 2018–19 season on October 14, Wideman ended a year-long goal-scoring drought when he scored two goals against the Los Angeles Kings.

==== Uber incident ====
On November 4, a video was released showing Wideman and six of his teammates criticizing the Ottawa Senators and mocking assistant coach Marty Raymond while riding in the back of an Uber vehicle in Phoenix, Arizona. The video had been recorded on October 29, without the players' knowledge, with Wideman and teammate Matt Duchene talking the most in the video. The video was released by the Uber driver, who was apparently upset by the players' tip and behavior. Wideman, along with the other players involved, later issued a statement apologizing for the incident.

==== Edmonton Oilers, Florida Panthers and Pittsburgh Penguins ====
After the Uber incident, Wideman was traded three times in four months. On November 22, Wideman was traded by the Senators to the Edmonton Oilers in exchange for a 2020 conditional sixth-round pick. Over the course of a month with the Oilers, Wideman featured in only five games for two assists before he was dealt for a second time within the season, leaving the Oilers along with a 2019 third-round pick, to the Florida Panthers in exchange for Alex Petrovic on December 30, 2018. Wideman made his Panthers debut in a 4–3 overtime defeat to the Columbus Blue Jackets on January 5, 2019, before he was placed on waivers the following day. He cleared waivers and was assigned to the Panthers' AHL affiliate, the Springfield Thunderbirds, where he collected 3 goals and 13 points through 16 games from the blueline.

At the trade deadline, Wideman's journeyman season continued as he was dealt for the third time, traded by the Panthers to the Pittsburgh Penguins in exchange for Jean-Sébastien Dea on February 25. He was assigned to report directly to AHL affiliate, the Wilkes-Barre/Scranton Penguins.

==== Anaheim Ducks ====
As a free agent from the Penguins, Wideman was signed to a one-year, two-way contract with the Anaheim Ducks on July 16, 2019. He did not feature for the Ducks during the 2019–20 season, assigned to AHL affiliate the San Diego Gulls, posting 31 points through 53 games before the remainder of the season was cancelled due to the COVID-19 pandemic in North America. He was named to the 2020 AHL All-Star Classic along with teammate Anthony Stolarz.

==== Torpedo Nizhny Novgorod ====
As an impending free agent from the Ducks, Wideman opted to pursue a career in Russia, agreeing to a one-year contract with Torpedo Nizhny Novgorod of the Kontinental Hockey League (KHL), on June 1, 2020. During the 2020–21 KHL season, he was named KHL Top Defenseman of the Year.

==== Montreal Canadiens ====
Following his success in the KHL, Wideman returned to the NHL for the 2021–22 season after signing a one-year, $750,000 contract with the Montreal Canadiens. In 64 appearances with the team that season, he scored 4 goals and 23 assists for a career-best 27-point NHL season. He tied Jeff Petry for the most points by a Canadiens defenseman for the year. He assumed a key role helping to run the team's power play. Following the end of the season, the Canadiens re-signed Wideman to a two-year, $1.525 million contract. Wideman had used the jersey number 20 for his first season with the Canadiens, but he agreed to cede the number to the team's 2022 first overall draft pick Juraj Slafkovský in exchange for an autographed jersey as a keepsake for his newborn son. On April 16, 2024, after missing the entirety of the 2023–24 season due to a serious back injury, Wideman announced that he would likely never play professional hockey again. Subsequently, Wideman formally announced his retirement on September 17, 2024.

== International play ==
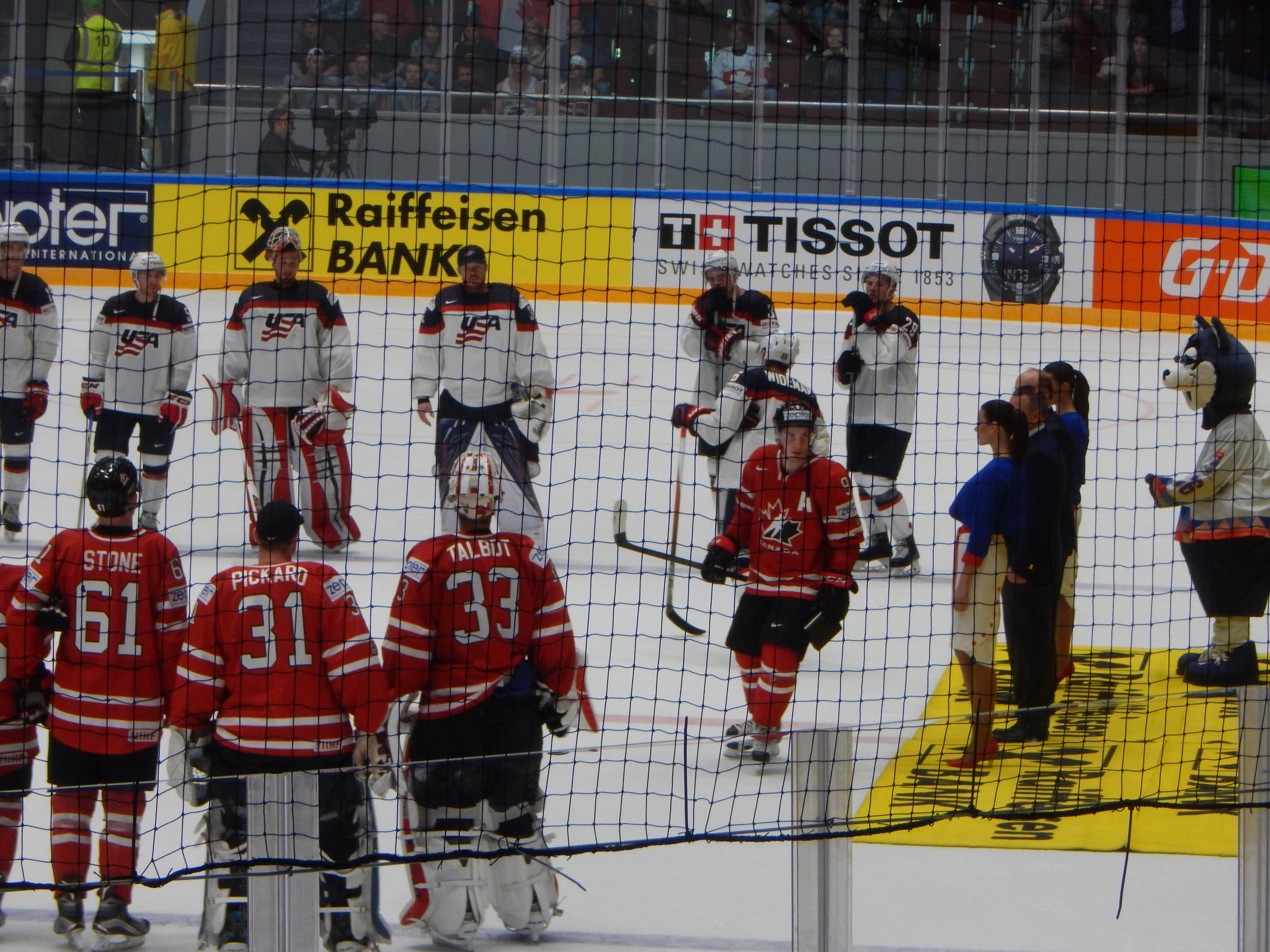
Wideman and former Senators' teammate Matt Duchene are named Players of the Game for Team USA and Team Canada respectively at the 2016 World Championship

Medal record

Representing United States

Ice hockey

World Championships
Bronze medal – third place	2021 Latvia	

Wideman was selected to play for Team USA at the 2016 IIHF World Championship. The team finished fourth in the tournament, losing 7–2 in the bronze medal game to Russia. He was named to Team USA for the 2021 IIHF World Championship and won a bronze medal as they beat Germany 6–1, coming third in the tournament.

== Personal life ==
Wideman is married with one child. When this child was born, Wideman agreed to cede his number 20 jersey to Juraj Slafkovský, in exchange for an autographed jersey as a keepsake.

== Career statistics ==
=== Regular season and playoffs ===
			Regular season					Playoffs
Season	Team	League	GP	G	A	Pts	PIM	GP	G	A	Pts	PIM
2004–05	Chaminade College Preparatory School	HS-MO		4	5	9		—	—	—	—	—
2005–06	Chaminade College Preparatory School	HS-MO		5	16	21		—	—	—	—	—
2006–07	Chaminade College Preparatory School	HS-MO		9	6	15		—	—	—	—	—
2006–07	St. Louis Blues 16U AAA	AAA	62	9	21	30	122	—	—	—	—	—
2006–07	St. Louis Bandits	NAHL	1	0	0	0	0	7	0	1	1	4
2007–08	Cedar Rapids RoughRiders	USHL	53	2	12	14	51	1	0	0	0	0
2008–09	Miami RedHawks	CCHA	39	0	26	26	56	—	—	—	—	—
2009–10	Miami RedHawks	CCHA	44	5	17	22	63	—	—	—	—	—
2010–11	Miami RedHawks	CCHA	39	3	20	23	32	—	—	—	—	—
2011–12	Miami RedHawks	CCHA	41	4	20	24	40	—	—	—	—	—
2012–13	Elmira Jackals	ECHL	5	0	5	5	7	—	—	—	—	—
2012–13	Binghamton Senators	AHL	60	2	16	18	46	3	1	2	3	2
2013–14	Binghamton Senators	AHL	73	9	42	51	101	4	1	0	1	6
2014–15	Binghamton Senators	AHL	75	19	42	61	116	—	—	—	—	—
2015–16	Ottawa Senators	NHL	64	6	7	13	34	—	—	—	—	—
2016–17	Ottawa Senators	NHL	76	5	12	17	46	15	1	3	4	4
2017–18	Ottawa Senators	NHL	16	3	5	8	6	—	—	—	—	—
2018–19	Ottawa Senators	NHL	19	2	3	5	12	—	—	—	—	—
2018–19	Edmonton Oilers	NHL	5	0	2	2	4	—	—	—	—	—
2018–19	Florida Panthers	NHL	1	0	0	0	2	—	—	—	—	—
2018–19	Springfield Thunderbirds	AHL	16	3	10	13	12	—	—	—	—	—
2018–19	Wilkes-Barre/Scranton Penguins	AHL	3	0	2	2	7	—	—	—	—	—
2019–20	San Diego Gulls	AHL	53	9	22	31	73	—	—	—	—	—
2020–21	Torpedo Nizhny Novgorod	KHL	59	9	32	41	73	4	1	1	2	20
2021–22	Montreal Canadiens	NHL	64	4	23	27	67	—	—	—	—	—
2022–23	Montreal Canadiens	NHL	46	0	6	6	81	—	—	—	—	—
NHL totals			291	20	58	78	252	15	1	3	4	4
KHL totals			59	9	32	41	73	4	1	1	2	20

=== International ===
Year	Team	Event	Result	GP	G	A	Pts	PIM
2016	United States	WC	4th	10	2	4	6	8
2021	United States	WC	3rd place, bronze medalist(s)	9	0	0	0	2
Senior totals				19	2	4	6	10

== Awards and honors ==
Award	Year
College
CCHA All-Rookie Team	2009
CCHA Second All-Star Team	2011
AHL
CCM/AHL Player of the Month	October 2014
CCM/AHL Player of the Week	November 3, 2014
All-Star Game	2015, 2020
Eddie Shore Award	2015
First All-Star Team	2015
KHL
Best Defenseman	2021
