= Paul Stastny =

Canadian-American ice hockey player

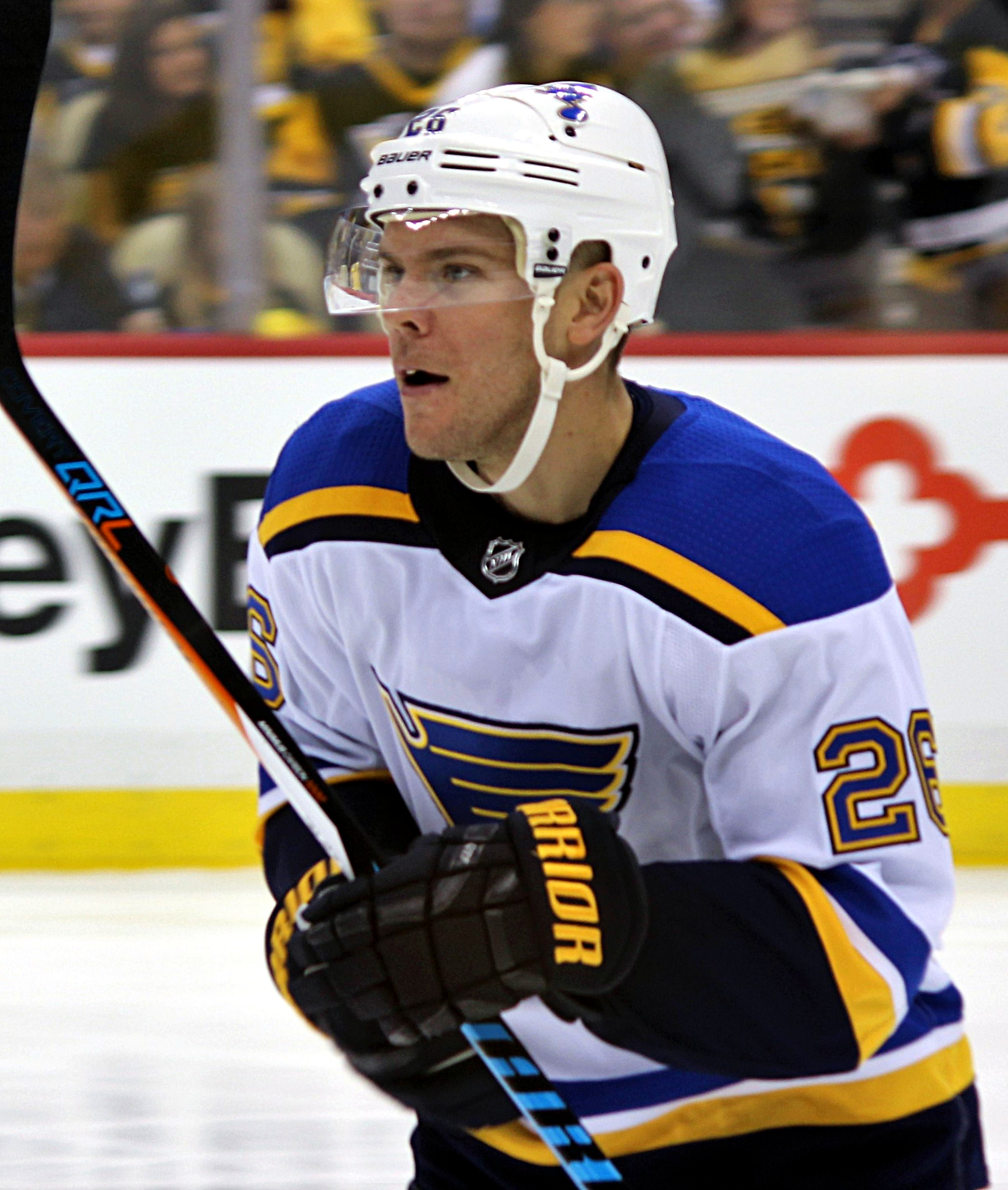
- Stastny with the St. Louis Blues in 2017
- Born: December 27, 1985 (age 40) Quebec City, Quebec, Canada
- Height: 6 ft 0 in (183 cm)
- Weight: 193 lb (88 kg; 13 st 11 lb)
- Position: Centre
- Shot: Left
- Played for: Colorado Avalanche; EHC München; St. Louis Blues; Winnipeg Jets; Vegas Golden Knights; Carolina Hurricanes
- National team: United States
- NHL draft: 44th overall, 2005; Colorado Avalanche
- Playing career: 2006–2023

Paul Stastny (/ˈstæstniː/; Slovak pronunciation: [ˈʂcastniː]) (born December 27, 1985) is a Canadian-American former professional ice hockey center who played 17 seasons in the National Hockey League (NHL) for the Colorado Avalanche, St. Louis Blues, Winnipeg Jets, Vegas Golden Knights, and Carolina Hurricanes.

Of Slovak lineage, Stastny is the son of Peter Šťastný, a Hockey Hall of Famer who played for the Colorado Avalanche's predecessor, the Quebec Nordiques, and finished his career with the St. Louis Blues. Stastny's older brother Yan has played for the Boston Bruins, Edmonton Oilers and St. Louis Blues. His uncles Anton and Marián Šťastný both played in the NHL during the 1980s, also for the Nordiques.

Stastny began his junior hockey career with the River City Lancers of the United States Hockey League before moving to the Pioneers at the University of Denver in 2004. After winning the NCAA Men's Ice Hockey Championship in his first season playing for the Pioneers, he remained at the university for one more season. He signed a contract with the Avalanche before the 2006–07 NHL season, scored 78 points in 82 games in his rookie season, and was nominated for the Calder Memorial Trophy. In the 2007–08 season, he was named to his first NHL All-Star Game but did not play because of an appendectomy. As a dual citizen, Stastny has chosen to represent the U.S. in international hockey competitions, including the 2004 Viking Cup, the 2007 IIHF World Championship, and the 2010 and 2014 Winter Olympics.

== Early years and family ==
Stastny was born on December 27, 1985, in Quebec City, Quebec, Canada, to Peter Šťastný (anglicized to Stastny) and his wife Darina, while Peter was playing for the Quebec Nordiques. Paul spent his early years in Quebec and New Jersey, following his father's career. Peter joined the St. Louis Blues in 1993 and settled there after finishing his player career, working as a scout for the team.

As a youth, Stastny played in the 1999 Quebec International Pee-Wee Hockey Tournament with the St. Louis Blues' minor ice hockey team. He played high school hockey for Chaminade College Preparatory School in St. Louis, Missouri, during his freshman and sophomore years in high school, but he left the high school team to play for the Tier III Junior B St. Louis Jr. Blues. He then moved to Omaha, Nebraska, to play Tier I junior hockey for the River City Lancers of the United States Hockey League (USHL) during his last two years of high school, graduating from Millard North High School in Omaha.

Born in Canada to a mother with American citizenship, Stastny and his brother Yan have dual Canadian/U.S. citizenship. He also has two sisters, Katarina and Kristina. He has mentioned "religion, education and the importance of family" as principle values in his upbringing, and has spoken about his father's help in making him a better player.

Stastny has numerous family relatives who have played in the NHL. Besides being the son of Peter Šťastný, the first European-trained player to reach 1,000 points in the NHL, he is also the nephew of retired NHL players Anton and Marián Šťastný. Peter and Anton were the first two of the three Šťastný brothers to arrive in North America, in 1980; they were smuggled, along with Peter's pregnant wife, out of Czechoslovakia into Austria with the help of the Nordiques' president Marcel Aubut and chief scout Gilles Leger. Their brother Marián arrived a year later, after Peter and Anton had raised the US$30,000 needed to bribe Czechoslovak government officials. All three played for the Nordiques from 1981 to 1985, only the third time that three brothers had played together for the same team in the NHL. The first three brothers to have played simultaneously for the same team were Reg, Doug, and Max Bentley, who played with the Chicago Black Hawks in 1943, followed by the three Plager brothers, Bill, Barclay, and Bob, who played with the St. Louis Blues from 1968 to 1972. Stastny's older brother Yan has played for the Boston Bruins, Edmonton Oilers, and St. Louis Blues. He also played for CSKA Moscow in the KHL. Peter and Paul Stastny currently rank fourth all-time in total scoring by a father–son combination in the NHL. In 2022, Paul Stastny made a $1,000 donation to the Canadian truckers' "Freedom Convoy" which was seized by the Canadian government.

== Playing career ==
=== Amateur career ===
Stastny began his junior ice hockey career in 2002 with the USHL's River City Lancers, playing with the team for two seasons and scoring 107 points in 113 games. In 2002–03, the Lancers finished the regular season fourth in the West Division and progressed to the playoffs. After advancing two rounds, the Lancers lost in the Clark Cup final against the Lincoln Stars. In 2003–04, the Lancers finished third in the West Division and lost in the first round of the playoffs against the Sioux City Musketeers. Stastny's 77 points in 56 games ranked him second in the league behind teammate Mike Howe.

He entered the University of Denver in 2004, to play for the Pioneers in the Western Collegiate Hockey Association of the National Collegiate Athletic Association. Despite entering college hockey at a younger age than usual for a USHL player, Stastny scored 45 points in 42 games in his first season with the Pioneers, helping them win the MacNaughton Cup and Broadmoor Trophy. He then helped the team win its second NCAA Men's Ice Hockey Championship in a row by scoring two power-play goals in the final game at the 2005 Frozen Four tournament against the North Dakota Fighting Hawks. Stastny won the award for WCHA Rookie of the Year and was part of the WCHA All-Rookie Team and the NCAA Championship All-Tournament Team.

In 2005–06, Stastny scored 53 points in 39 games and finished seventh overall in the NCAA scoring list, tied with Matt Carle for the Pioneers' scoring lead. He scored 44 points in 28 conference games to win the WCHA scoring title.

Stastny was part of the WCHA First All-Star Team and the NCAA West Second All-American Team, as the Pioneers finished the WCHA regular season in second place and lost in the first round of the playoffs against the Minnesota Duluth Bulldogs. At the end of the season, he graduated from the University of Denver as a business major.

=== Colorado Avalanche (2006–2014) ===
Stastny was draft-eligible in the 2004 NHL entry draft, but he chose to opt out on that occasion. Prior to the draft, the NHL Central Scouting Bureau ranked him as the 49th-best North-American skater available. The following year, he was ranked as the 74th best in the 2005 NHL entry draft, and was drafted by the Colorado Avalanche in the second round, the 44th selection overall. Before the franchise moved from Quebec City to Denver in 1996, the Avalanche were the Quebec Nordiques, the team for which his father had played from 1980 to 1990, after which his jersey number (26) was retired. Stastny signed a multi-year contract with the Avalanche on July 24, 2006, and began his professional career in the 2006–07 NHL season.

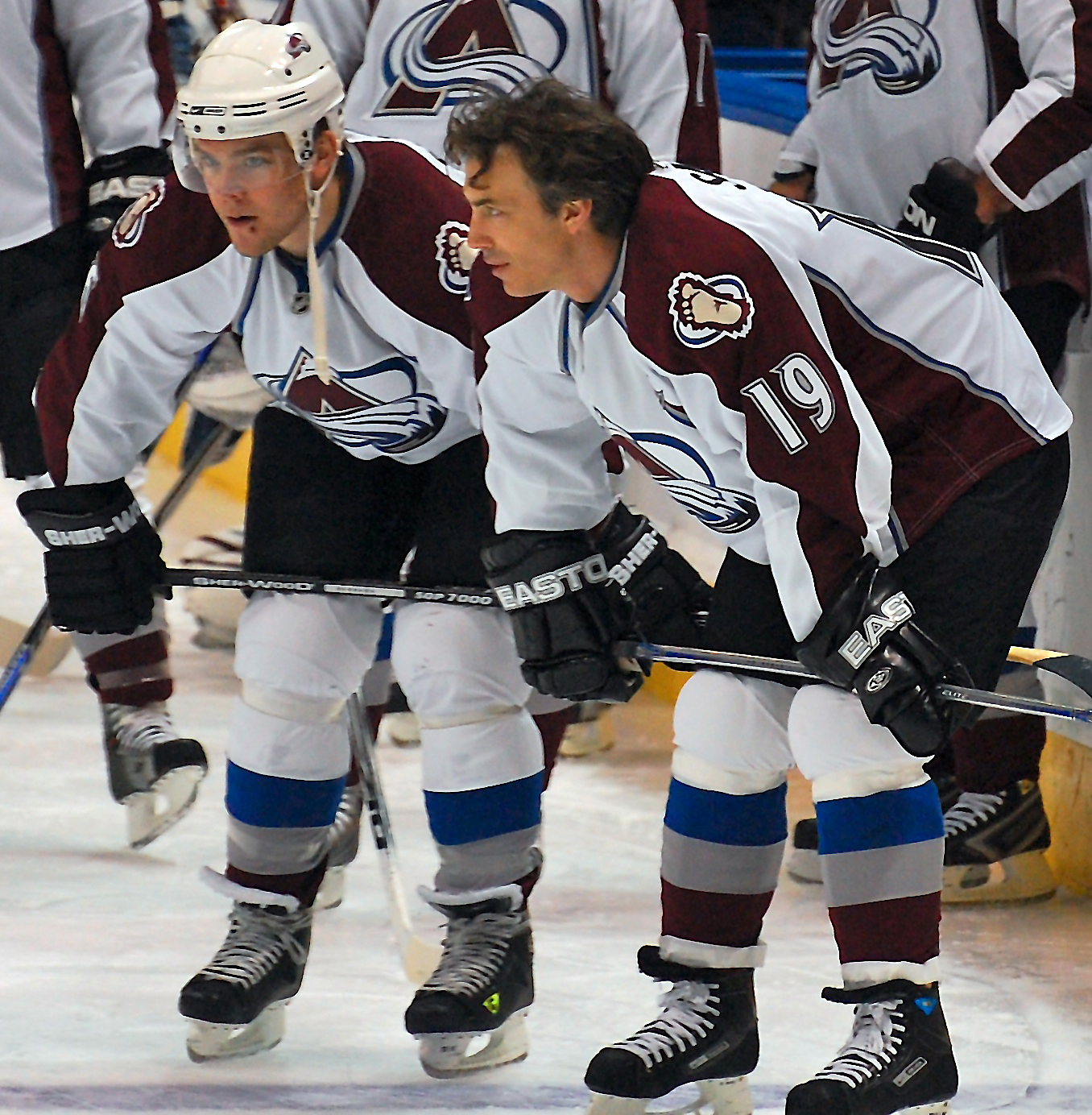
Stastny being mentored by Joe Sakic, who was himself mentored by Stastny's father, Peter, at the start of Sakic's career with the Nordiques

Before training camp, he was not expected to start the season with the Avalanche, but rather for a minor league affiliate team. However, Steve Konowalchuk's career-ending heart problem opened a roster spot and Stastny's play impressed Avalanche coach Joel Quenneville. He started the season with the jersey number 62 until his teammate John-Michael Liles switched to jersey number 4 to let Stastny use 26, the number that his father had worn when he played for the Nordiques. Stastny had his first NHL assist on a goal by Wojtek Wolski in his third NHL game, on October 8, 2006, against the Vancouver Canucks. On October 21, in his eighth NHL game and his first wearing jersey number 26, Stastny scored his first NHL goal in Montreal against David Aebischer of the Montreal Canadiens.

On February 21, 2007, Stastny scored two goals and passed Alex Tanguay's total of 51 points to set a new Avalanche record for points by a rookie. His father holds the franchise record with 109. Between February 3 and March 17, he had a 20-game scoring streak, breaking not only his father's franchise rookie record of 16 games, but also the NHL rookie record of 17 games that belonged to Teemu Selänne. He scored 11 goals and had 18 assists during that period and became the third-youngest player in NHL history to record a 20-game scoring streak, following Mario Lemieux and Wayne Gretzky. At the start of the season, Wolski was the Avalanche player seen as favorite to contend for the Calder Memorial Trophy; however, the scoring streak put Stastny into contention as well. Stastny's play was one of the reasons the Avalanche experienced their best run of the season towards the end, winning 15 of their last 19 games but missing the playoffs by one point. Stastny ended his rookie season with 78 points, finished second to Pittsburgh Penguins' Evgeni Malkin in the voting for the Calder Memorial Trophy and was named to the 2006–07 NHL All-Rookie Team.

Coming into his sophomore season, Stastny admitted the pressure would increase during the year. He continued the strong finish of his rookie year, by scoring his first career hat-trick against Marty Turco of the Dallas Stars in the season's first game and scoring five points for the first time four days later, against the San Jose Sharks. He scored 15 goals and had 28 assists in his first 34 games of the season, and had his 100th NHL point in his 99th NHL game. At the same time, Stastny hit a slump, during which he had one point in eight games. With the Avalanche having lost top players Joe Sakic and Ryan Smyth to injuries, Ryan Kennedy of The Hockey News pointed to Stastny's inconsistency and wrote it was time for Stastny to step up and be a leader in all aspects. Despite being on the longest scoreless streak of his career, which lasted 10 games, on January 11, 2008, the NHL announced Stastny would play at the 56th National Hockey League All-Star Game. He scored two goals and three assists in three games before the Colorado Avalanche announced six days later that Stastny would miss approximately 2–3 weeks, including his first All-Star Game to have his appendix removed. After recovering from the surgery and returning to skating, he suffered a groin injury during a practice, delaying his return. Stastny ended up missing 15 games, but he scored a goal on his comeback against the Phoenix Coyotes on February 22. He scored seven goals and had 15 assists until the end of the regular season, missing a game due to flu on March 20. With 71 points scored, he finished the regular season as the team's scoring leader and the Avalanche finished 6th in the West, progressing to the playoffs to play against the Minnesota Wild. Stastny failed to score a point until the fifth game, when his game-winning goal gave the Avalanche the lead in the series. Colorado ended the series by winning the sixth game and progressed to meet the Detroit Red Wings in the Western Conference Semifinals. Stastny scored a goal and an assist in the first game of the series, but a depleted Avalanche team was swept in four games. Stastny missed the last game of the series after he injured his knee during the first period of the third game.

On November 17, 2008, Stastny signed a five-year, US$33 million contract extension with the Avalanche. The contract began in the 2009–10 season and ran through 2013–14; he was paid an average of $6.6 million a year. Stastny earned $710,000 during the 2008–09 season. In a December 23, game against the Phoenix Coyotes, Paul suffered a fractured forearm after being struck by a shot from Phoenix forward Olli Jokinen in the last regulation minute of the game. He successfully underwent surgery on his arm and missed 24 games, but also his chance to play in the 2009 All-Star Game in Montreal. This was the second consecutive season that he missed such an opportunity. He was injured again later in the season when he broke his foot while blocking a shot during a March 17, 2009 game against the Minnesota Wild, putting him out of play for the rest of the season. He scored 36 points in just 45 games that year. Stastny ended the injury-plagued 2008–09 season with 11 goals and 25 assists for 36 points in 45 games while the Avalanche struggled heavily as a team and finishing last in the Western Conference.

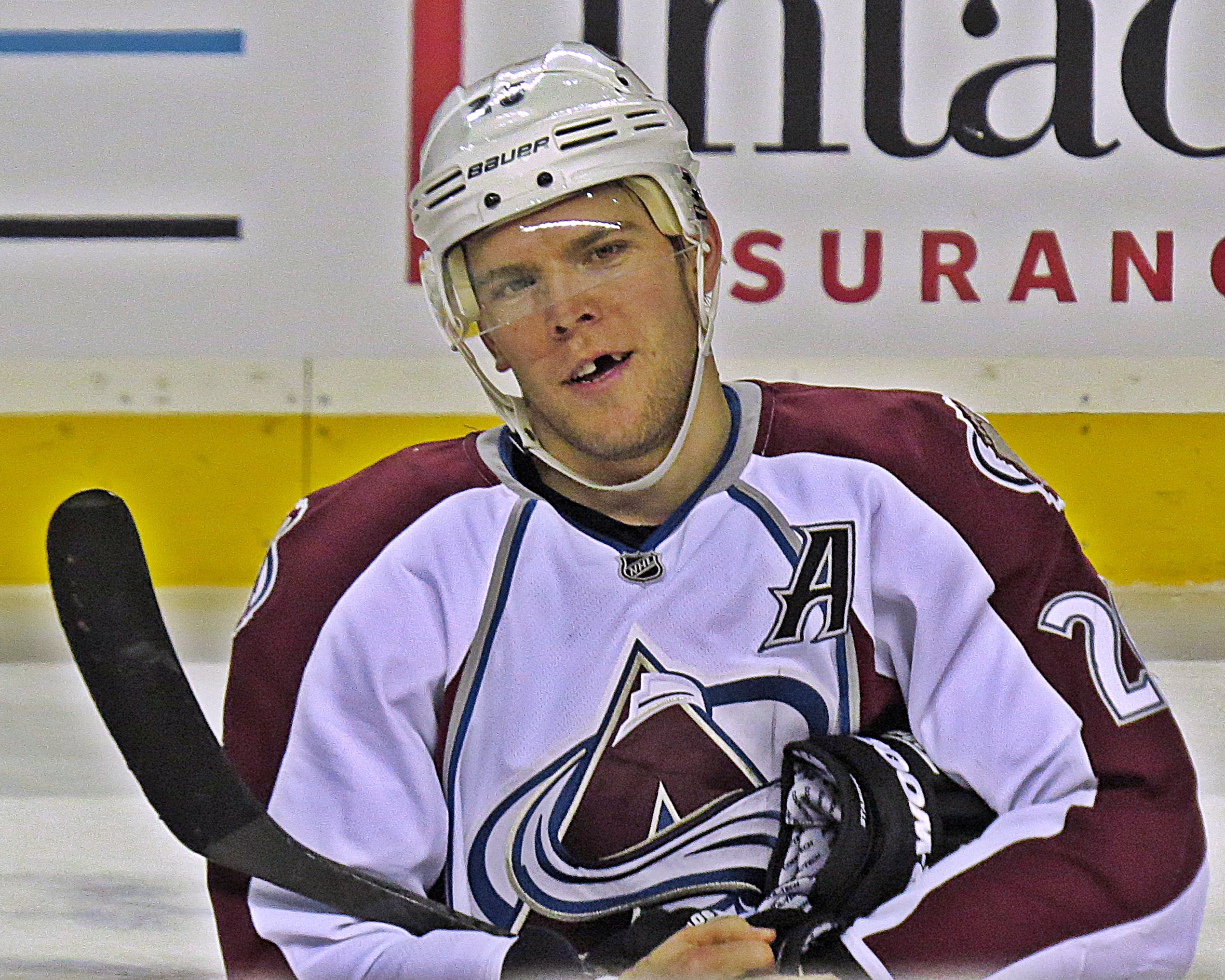
Stastny with the Avalanche in December 2013. The 2013–14 season was his last season with the Avalanche

The 2009–10 season proved successful for Stastny and the Avalanche. He stayed uninjured the entire season, and only missed one game as a healthy scratch after the Avalanche narrowly clinched a playoff spot the previous evening as the eighth and final seed in the West. His 79 points (20 goals, 59 assists)in 81 games was a career best, and he led the team in points and assists. Tied with Washington Capitals forward and captain Alexander Ovechkin, only five players in the league ended up with more assists. Stastny's second career appearance in the post season ended after the top-seeded San Jose Sharks eliminated the Avs in six games in the first round in the 2010 playoffs.

On December 15, 2010, in a 4–3 win over the Chicago Blackhawks, Stastny was hit into the boards by Chicago' forward Bryan Bickell, resulting in Stastny developing a sore back and neck. He got up on his feet on his own power and finished the game but missed the following game two days later against the Ottawa Senators (in which the Avalanche won 6–5) before returning to the Avs lineup after a one-game absence on December 19, in a 3–2 win over the Montreal Canadiens. On January 26, 2011, Stastny was named to his second NHL All-Star Game. He and his father became the 8th father-son duo in NHL history to both play in an All-Star Game. He finished the 2010–11 season with 22 goals and 35 assists for 57 points. Despite his continued consistent individual production, the Avalanche continued to struggle as a team, finishing second-to-last in the West and in the league altogether and 29 points out of the eighth and final playoff spot.

With the delay of the 2012–13 season due to the lockout, Stastny followed his brother's footsteps to Germany and signed his first European contract with EHC München of the Deutsche Eishockey Liga on November 15, 2012. Stastny appeared in 13 games for Red Bull climbing to third among the team with 18 points before returning to the Avalanche upon the tentative lockout resolution on January 6, 2013.

At the trade deadline of the 2013–14 season, the Avalanche and their GM, Joe Sakic were looking to trade Stastny to ensure a return for the soon-to-be Free Agent. Stastny promised them a "Hometown Discount" if they held onto him through the Avalanche playoff run.

=== St. Louis Blues (2014–2018) ===
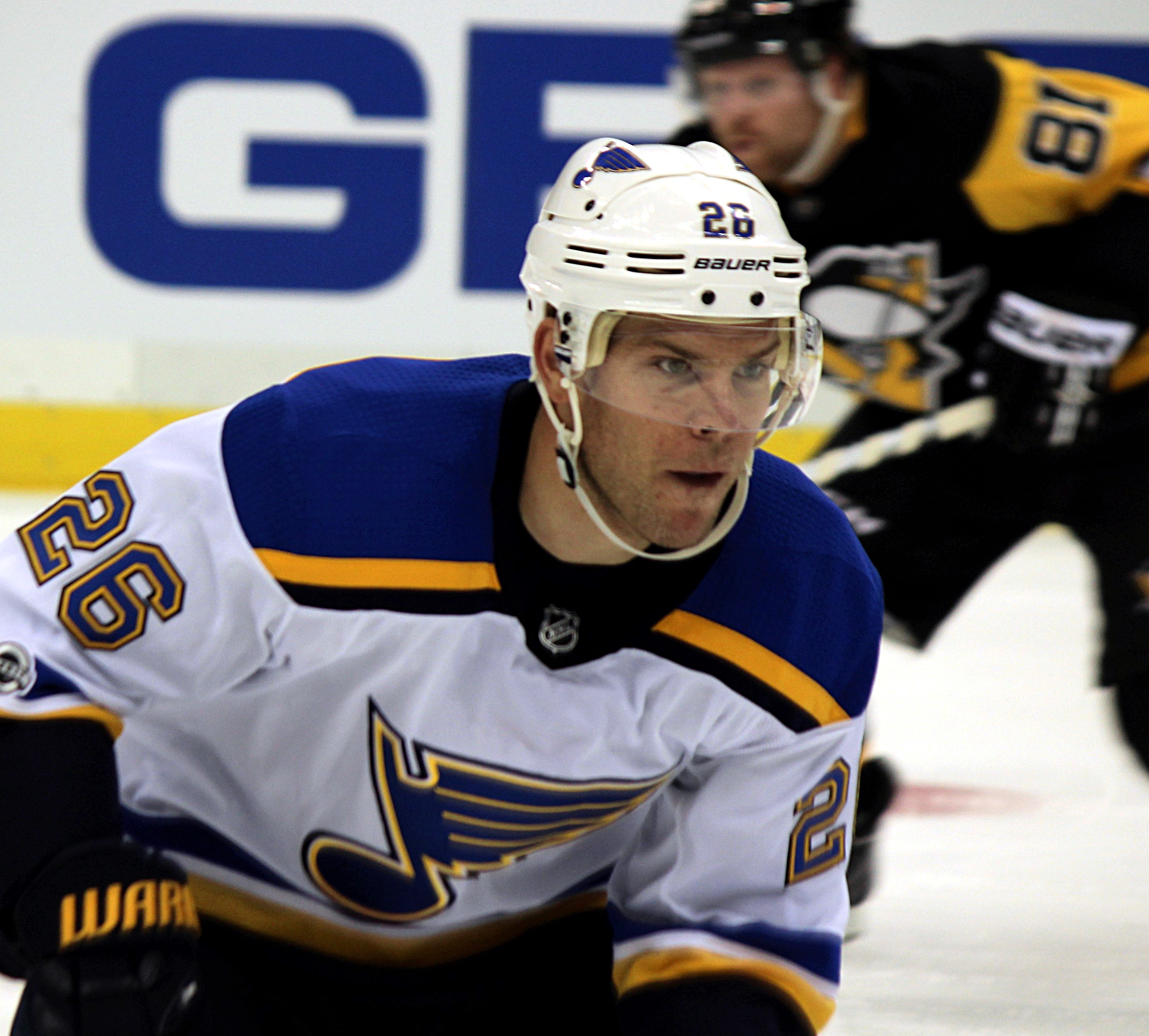
Stastny with the St. Louis Blues in October 2017

Unable to agree a new contract with the Avalanche, Stastny entered free agency for the first time in his career and, on July 1, 2014, he signed a four-year, $28 million contract with the St. Louis Blues, his hometown club and Avalanche divisional rivals. Upon signing Stastny, Blues' general manager Doug Armstrong said he envisioned using their new player as one of the "top-two centers to compete in the deep Western Conference." Stastny played three games with the Blues, recording one goal and three assists, before suffering an upper-body injury during a game against the Arizona Coyotes. He was activated off injured reserve on November 6, having missed eight games. While he was injured, Stastny was replaced on the second line by Jori Lehterä and was relegated to the third line center role on his return. Consequently, his production in St. Louis fell short of his previous production in Colorado and he averaged 0.655 points per game through 58 games that season.

Stastny returned to the Blues for their 2015–16 season but suffered another injury in early October. He sustained a lower-body injury during a game against the Vancouver Canucks, and was sidelined for 16 games. Despite this setback, his production picked up and by April he had recorded six multi-point games in nine straight games and points in four consecutive games. His offensive output helped the Blues qualify for the 2016 Stanley Cup playoffs where he recorded 17 points in 33 playoff games. During their series against the Dallas Stars, Stastny played on the Blues' top line with Troy Brouwer and Alexander Steen.

Stastny returned to the Blues for their 2016–17 season training camp alongside his brother Yan, who had signed a professional tryout agreement, and was named an alternate captain prior to their opening night alongside Steen, Vladimir Tarasenko, and Kevin Shattenkirk. His season was again shortened as a result of injuries and he was placed on injured reserve on February 14, 2017. At the time of his injury, he had recorded 15 goals and 20 assists.

=== Winnipeg Jets (2018) ===
On February 26, 2018, in the final year of his contract, Stastny was traded to the Winnipeg Jets in exchange for Erik Foley, a conditional first-round pick in 2018, and a conditional fourth-round pick in 2020. In his Jets debut, Stastny played on a line with Patrik Laine and Nikolaj Ehlers. He scored a goal and an assist in a 6–5 loss to the Nashville Predators. Stastny had the most productive playoff performance of his career with the Jets, scoring 15 points in 17 playoff games. He appeared in the second conference finals with the Jets, ultimately losing in five games to the Vegas Golden Knights.

=== Vegas Golden Knights (2018–2020) ===
Stastny, as a free agent, signed a three-year, $19.5 million deal with the Vegas Golden Knights on July 1, 2018, with an annual value of $6.5 million. In his first season with the Golden Knights, Stastny was limited to 50 games but produced 42 points. In the 2019 Stanley Cup playoffs, he found chemistry centering a line with Mark Stone and Max Pacioretty, scoring eight points in seven games. Despite their explosive production, the Golden Knights lost to the San Jose Sharks in seven games.

In Stastny's final campaign with the Golden Knights, in the shortened 2019–20 season, he began the year centering the team's second line with Reilly Smith and Jonathan Marchessault. His offensive output declined during the season, which he hinted in December was due to a lingering injury, and he was subsequently relegated to the team's third line alongside rookie Cody Glass and Alex Tuch. By the time the season was suspended due to the COVID-19 pandemic, he had recorded 38 points in 71 games. When the team returned to the ice, he rejoined the second line and helped the Knights in their deep run at the 2020 Stanley Cup playoffs, where he scored nine points in 18 games, helping the Knights reach the Western Conference Finals before losing to the Dallas Stars in five games.

=== Return to Winnipeg (2020–2022) ===
On October 9, 2020, with a year remaining on his contract, Stastny was traded by the Golden Knights back to the Winnipeg Jets in exchange for Carl Dahlström and a 2022 fourth-round pick. On his return to Winnipeg, Stastny was praised by teammates for being "personable" and "easy-going", and having "so much knowledge of the game". Upon joining the Jets' lineup, he skated on a second line with Ehlers and Laine, and tried out as a winger. On March 21, 2021, Stastny played in his 977th career NHL game, tying his father's record. On May 11, 2021, he played in his 1,000th career NHL game, having surpassed his father's record.

On July 26, 2021, Stastny signed a one-year, $3.75 million contract extension with the Jets. In the 2021–22 season, Stastny was relied upon as a veteran presence with the Jets, and through his versatility was used in a top-six scoring role. He collected his 500th NHL career assist, on a goal from Nikolaj Ehlers, in a 4–2 victory against the St. Louis Blues on December 19, 2021. He reached the 20 goal marker for the first time since 2014 after scoring against the Montreal Canadiens on April 11, 2022. Unable to help the Jets qualify for the playoffs, Stastny finished the season ranked sixth in team scoring with 21 goals and 24 assists for 45 points in 71 games.

=== Carolina Hurricanes and retirement (2022–2023) ===
As a free agent from the Jets, Stastny joined his fifth club and first Eastern Conference team in signing a one-year, $1.5 million contract with the Carolina Hurricanes on August 23, 2022. In Game 6 of the first round of the Stanley Cup playoffs against the New York Islanders, Stastny scored the game-winning goal in overtime to clinch the series victory and advance to the next round.

On October 31, 2023, Stastny announced his retirement from professional hockey after 17 seasons.

== International play ==
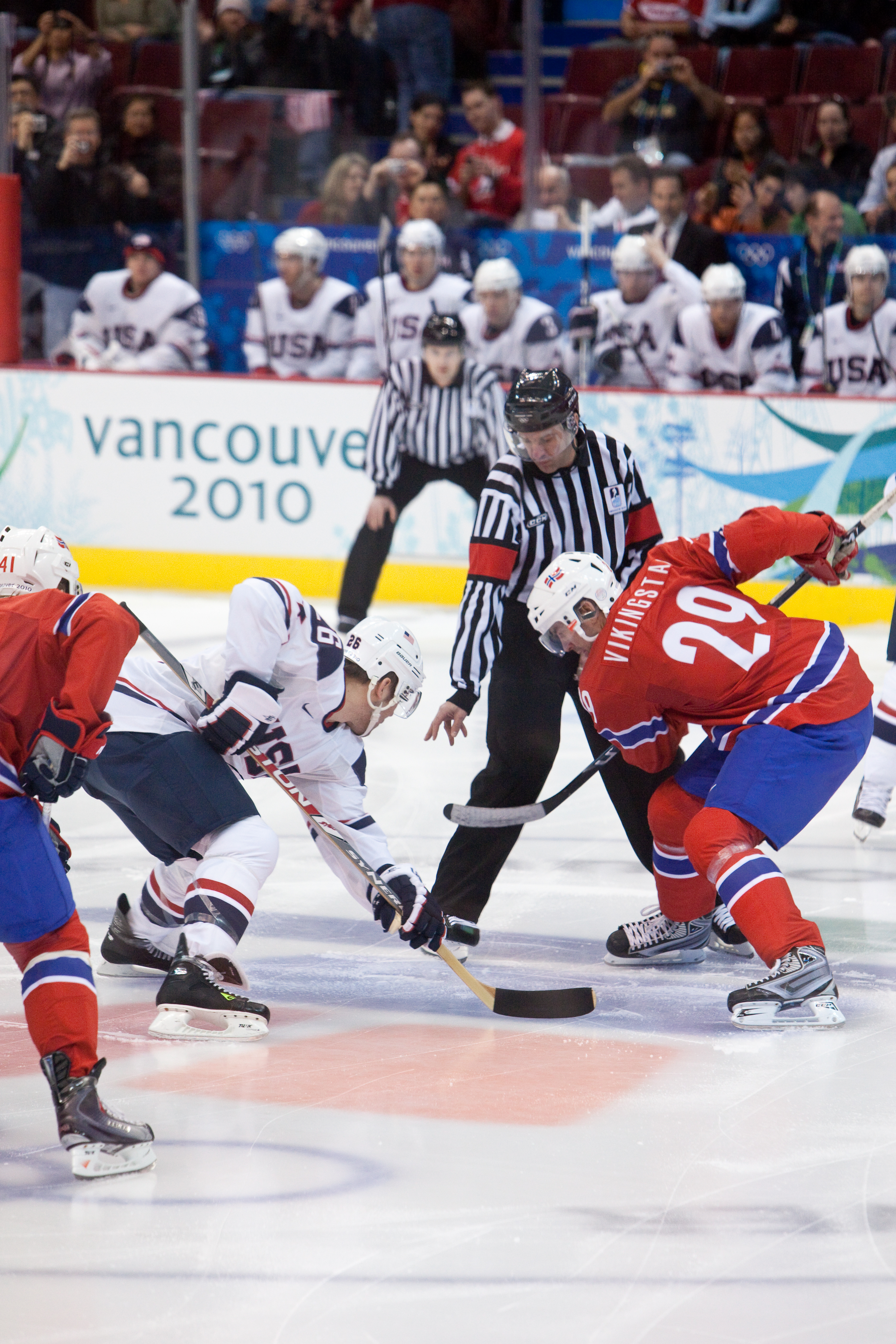
- Stastny taking a face-off against Norway's; Tore Vikingstad

Medal record

Representing United States

Men's ice hockey

Olympic Games
Silver medal – second place	2010 Vancouver	

World Championships
Bronze medal – third place	2013 Sweden/Finland	

Although born in Canada, Stastny is a dual citizen of Canada and the United States; both he and his brother Yan have chosen to represent the U.S. in international competition. One reason that led Paul to make the choice was the possibility of competing internationally alongside his brother, who had already chosen to play for the U.S. Stastny first represented the U.S. in the 2004 Viking Cup, where he won a silver medal playing for the junior team. According to the Hockey's Future website, he was one of the most important American talents in the tournament.

Stastny was selected to play for the U.S. men's national ice hockey team for the first time in the 2007 IIHF World Championship. He played seven games, scored four goals and four assists, had two penalty minutes, and finished even in plus/minus. The U.S. team lost in the quarter-finals against Finland. Stastny was named the best American player in the 3–0 win against Germany, when he scored two goals and had one assist. He was chosen as one of the three best U.S. players at the tournament, together with Lee Stempniak and Toby Petersen.

Stastny was again selected to play for the U.S. ice hockey team in the 2010 Winter Olympics in Vancouver where he won a silver medal. He scored a goal and two assists over six games. Upon completion of a disappointing 2012–13 season with the Avalanche, he accepted an invitation to the 2013 World Championship event in Finland/Sweden and was selected as Team USA's captain. Stastny led the largely unheralded U.S. team, in claiming their country's first medal at the Championships since 2004, with shootout victory over Finland for the bronze medal on May 19, 2013. He finished the tournament in second place in individual scoring with 15 points in 10 games, resulting in selection to the World Championship All-Star Team.

== Style of play ==
Stastny is a left-handed center and was one of the few NHL players known to use a wood stick since 2005, preferring it through his first four seasons in the NHL. However, he made the switch to a graphite stick to begin his 2010–11 NHL season. He considers himself a playmaker, a characteristic he says he inherited from his father.

Paul reminds me a lot of his dad. ... His play-making ability, his vision on the ice, the ability to come up with loose pucks – the puck just seems to follow him around. But his play without the puck is the part that we enjoy. For a young kid, to have that hockey sense, is unusual.

— Joel Quenneville, The Globe and Mail, "The Stastny bloodline is clear to see"

Former Avalanche captain Joe Sakic, who played with Paul and Peter Stastny, sees similarities between the two, namely their strong skating and ability to see the game. Former Avalanche coach Joel Quenneville, who faced Peter during his playing career, has said Paul plays in a similar way and complimented his hockey sense. George Gwozdecky, Stastny's coach at the University of Denver, has complimented his intelligence, and his ability to pass and to "see" the ice. Although it has been said that Stastny is a slow skater, Gwozdecky too feels he is a strong skater. Terry Frei of ESPN has said that "... his game isn't flashy and eye-popping as much as it is heady, intuitive and efficient".

== Career statistics ==
=== Regular season and playoffs ===
			Regular season					Playoffs
Season	Team	League	GP	G	A	Pts	PIM	GP	G	A	Pts	PIM
2000–01	Chaminade College Preparatory School	HS-MO	—	15	30	45	—	—	—	—	—	—
2001–02	St. Louis Jr. Blues	CSHL	43	41	56	97	10	—	—	—	—	—
2001–02	Chaminade College Preparatory School	HS-MO	—	19	12	31	—	—	—	—	—	—
2002–03	River City Lancers	USHL	57	10	20	30	39	8	0	1	1	2
2003–04	River City Lancers	USHL	56	30	47	77	46	3	1	2	3	0
2004–05	Denver Pioneers	WCHA	42	17	28	45	30	—	—	—	—	—
2005–06	Denver Pioneers	WCHA	39	19	34	53	79	—	—	—	—	—
2006–07	Colorado Avalanche	NHL	82	28	50	78	42	—	—	—	—	—
2007–08	Colorado Avalanche	NHL	66	24	47	71	24	9	2	1	3	6
2008–09	Colorado Avalanche	NHL	45	11	25	36	22	—	—	—	—	—
2009–10	Colorado Avalanche	NHL	81	20	59	79	50	6	1	4	5	4
2010–11	Colorado Avalanche	NHL	74	22	35	57	56	—	—	—	—	—
2011–12	Colorado Avalanche	NHL	79	21	32	53	34	—	—	—	—	—
2012–13	EHC München	DEL	13	7	11	18	20	—	—	—	—	—
2012–13	Colorado Avalanche	NHL	40	9	15	24	14	—	—	—	—	—
2013–14	Colorado Avalanche	NHL	71	25	35	60	22	7	5	5	10	4
2014–15	St. Louis Blues	NHL	74	16	30	46	40	6	1	0	1	4
2015–16	St. Louis Blues	NHL	64	10	39	49	26	20	3	10	13	16
2016–17	St. Louis Blues	NHL	66	18	22	40	36	7	2	1	3	2
2017–18	St. Louis Blues	NHL	63	12	28	40	14	—	—	—	—	—
2017–18	Winnipeg Jets	NHL	19	4	9	13	4	17	6	9	15	0
2018–19	Vegas Golden Knights	NHL	50	13	29	42	30	7	2	6	8	2
2019–20	Vegas Golden Knights	NHL	71	17	21	38	24	18	3	6	9	8
2020–21	Winnipeg Jets	NHL	56	13	16	29	32	6	1	1	2	8
2021–22	Winnipeg Jets	NHL	71	21	24	45	14	—	—	—	—	—
2022–23	Carolina Hurricanes	NHL	73	9	13	22	16	15	4	0	4	4
NHL totals			1,145	293	529	822	500	118	30	43	73	58

=== International ===
Year	Team	Event	Result	GP	G	A	Pts	PIM
2007	United States	WC	5th	7	4	4	8	2
2010	United States	OG	2nd place, silver medalist(s)	6	1	2	3	0
2012	United States	WC	7th	8	3	6	9	0
2013	United States	WC	3rd place, bronze medalist(s)	10	7	8	15	6
2014	United States	OG	4th	6	2	0	2	0
Senior totals				37	17	20	37	8

== Awards and honors ==
Award	Year	Ref.
College
WCHA All-Rookie Team	2005	
WCHA Rookie of the Year	2005	
All-NCAA All-Tournament Team	2005	
WCHA First All-Star Team	2005–06	
AHCA West Second-Team All-American	2005–06	
NHL
All-Rookie Team	2007	
All-Star Game	2011	

== See also ==
- List of family relations in the National Hockey League

Awards and achievements
Preceded by Brady Murray	WCHA Rookie of the Year; 2004–05	Succeeded by Phil Kessel
