= Chaminade College Preparatory School (Missouri) =

Private high school in Creve Coeur, Missouri, US

Location
- 425 South Lindbergh Boulevard; Creve Coeur, Missouri 63131; United States; 38°38′59″N 90°24′25″W

Information
- Type: Private; day; boarding; college-preparatory; Catholic school
- Motto: Latin: Esto Vir (Be a Man)
- Religious affiliation: Roman Catholic
- Established: 1910; 116 years ago
- Founder: Society of Mary (Marianists)
- President: Todd Guidry
- Principal: Philip Rone (High school); Jack Twellman (Middle school)
- Grades: 6–12
- Gender: All-Boys
- Enrollment: 871 (Total); 544 (High school); 327 (Middle school) (2024–2025)
- Average class size: 18 students
- Student to teacher ratio: 9:1
- Campus size: 55 acres (220,000 m^{2})
- Campus type: Suburban
- Colors: Cardinal and white
- Athletics conference: Metro Catholic Conference
- Team name: Red Devils
- Accreditation: Central States Independent Schools Association; NCACS
- Newspaper: Cardinal and White
- Yearbook: The Cardinal
- Tuition: $25,500 for day students $54,363 for resident students
- Affiliation: Archdiocese of St. Louis
- Website: chaminade-stl.org
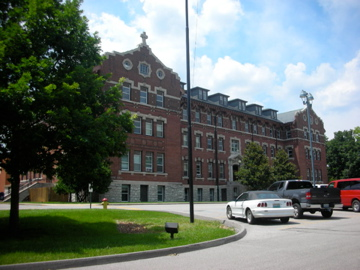
- Chaminade Hall, the main classroom building and the oldest facility

Chaminade College Preparatory School is an independent, college-preparatory Catholic school administered by the Marianist Order for boys in grades six through twelve in the Archdiocese of St. Louis. The school is located in Creve Coeur, Missouri.

The school offers 7-day, 5-day, and temporary boarding. Students come from throughout the United States and from countries throughout the world. Marianist Hall, the name of the newly constructed dormitory, accommodates up to eighty-six residents along with twelve prefects across its 31,700 square feet of living space.

The school bears the name of William Joseph Chaminade, a priest who lived during the era of the French Revolution and who founded the religious order that runs the school. The school maintains an active relationship with the Marianists through governance structures and the employment of lay and religious Marianists.

== History ==
Chaminade was founded by the Society of Mary in 1910, less than one hundred years after the school's namesake, Blessed Father William Joseph Chaminade, had founded the order, and only sixty years after the Marianists had established themselves in the United States. Originally it was a boarding and day school, with most of its students residing in the open dormitories that were located on the third and fourth floors of the main building; the priests and brothers of the Society of Mary resided in rooms on the north and south ends of each floor.

When the school opened in 1910, only one building, which later would be named "Chaminade Hall," existed on campus, besides the original farmhouse that existed when the land was purchased. In 1919, however, the school built a gymnasium north of the school building. The main building, the farmhouse, and the gymnasium were for many years the only permanent structures on the campus until the 1950s, when the school built new dormitories for students (Canning Hall), a new residence building for the members of the Marianist order, and a new chapel.

These buildings were connected to the main building and the gymnasium by a network of tunnels that allowed the priests and brothers to move between buildings without going outside. In 1970, the school constructed a new athletic facility named the Athletictron, and the school added the "West Wing" onto the back of Chaminade Hall in 1981. In 2002, the West Wing was expanded again, adding middle school classrooms, a cafeteria, and a new library. In 2011, construction was completed on the new Skip Viragh Center for the Arts. Rev. Ralph A. Siefert was President of Chaminade from 1987 to 2020 succeeded by Todd Guidry after his death in August 2021. He was the longest-serving president in the school's history. The 1000-seat auditorium in the Skip Viragh Center for the Arts was named in his honor.

== Facilities ==
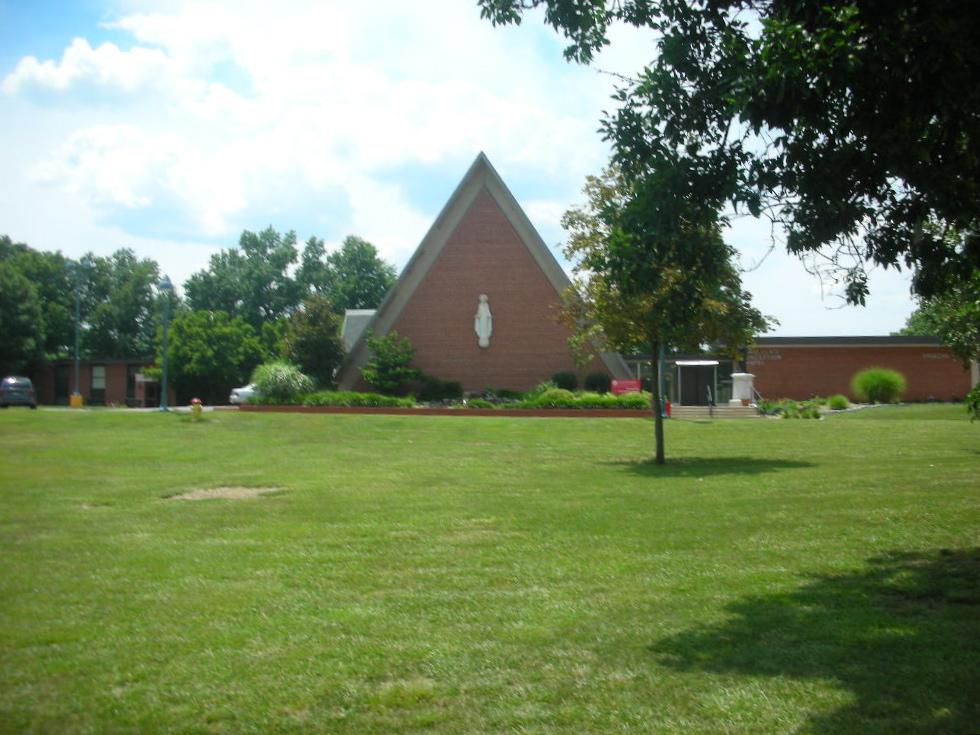
Canning Hall (left), Immaculate Conception Chapel (center), and Frische Hall (right).

Chaminade Hall is the main administrative and classroom building. It houses offices for the president, principal, and assistant principals, as well as the admissions office, the advancement office, and the business office. Most high school classrooms are in Chaminade Hall as well, spread over four floors and the basement.

The original gymnasium is Juergens Hall. It houses the middle school gym, football offices, trainer's room, one of Chaminade's exercise rooms, and middle school locker rooms.

Marianist Hall is the student dormitory and can house up to 86 students. Residence hall prefects also live in Marianist Hall.

Frische Hall is a former residence for religious members of the Society of Mary. Chaminade converted the building for use as faculty offices, the campus ministry center, faculty lounge, the activity club rooms, and Chaminade's student center. There is also a courtyard (originally a cloister garden) where the Bar-B-Que team's smoker sits.

The Immaculate Conception Chapel is the religious center of the campus. While the chapel is too small for the entire school to hold Mass, it is still used for smaller Masses and reconciliation services. The sacristy is inside Frische Hall.

The Athletictron is the athletic center for the school. It houses a basketball/volleyball court, a commons area, a concessions stand, locker rooms for men, women and faculty, and a swimming pool. The pool is not only used by Chaminade students but by other swim and dive teams in the area, such as St. Joseph's Academy and De Smet Jesuit. Other athletic facilities on campus include eight tennis courts, a football stadium and track, a baseball diamond, a soccer stadium, and two multi-purpose practice fields, one of which has an all-weather turf field. The West Wing or New Wing has a cafeteria, an Atrium, a library and media center, 16 middle school classrooms, and weight lifting facilities.

The Skip Viragh Center for the Arts, a performing and fine arts facility, opened in August 2011. This building houses a 1000-seat auditorium, four art classrooms, three music rehearsal rooms, several individual practice rooms, a smaller black box theatre, and an art gallery. This building was endowed by the family of Skip Viragh, a Chaminade alumnus who graduated in 1959.

== Academics ==
Chaminade offers a demanding academic program for students with superior, above average, or strong average ability. In recent years, Chaminade has expanded its college credit offerings to include, besides 23 Advanced Placement courses, 59 semester-long courses through Saint Louis University and the University of Missouri–St. Louis.

== Athletics ==
Chaminade offers over 60 teams in 18 different sports. Sports offered include baseball, basketball, bocce, bowling, cross country, football, golf, hockey, lacrosse, racquetball, rugby, soccer, swimming/diving, tennis, track/field, ultimate frisbee, volleyball, water polo, and wrestling. Chaminade is part of the Metro Catholic Conference with Christian Brothers College High School, De Smet Jesuit High School, St. John Vianney High School (Kirkwood, Missouri), and St. Louis University High School.

=== Missouri state championships ===
Chaminade teams have won 25 state championships competing in the Missouri State High School Activities Association.

- Baseball (2): 1992, 1998
- Basketball (2): 2009, 2016
- Cross Country (1): 2001
- Golf: 1988, 1997, 1998, 2001, 2004, 2017 (Joe Terschluse), 2021, 2023
- Hockey (1): 2025
- Soccer (3): 2001, 2002, 2006
- Swimming and diving (3): 1974, 1984, 2025
- Tennis (5): 1988, 1989, 1990, 1991, 1992
- Volleyball (2): 2009, 2019
- Wrestling (Danny Conley): 2017, 2018

== Student life ==
=== Activities ===
As of 2017, over 150 students participate in the school band which has won numerous regional and national awards, including first place in the 2010, 2011, and 2012 Midwest Festival of Music. In 2009, the Drama Club was selected to participate in the International Fringe Festival in Edinburgh, Scotland. Chaminade offers over 25 clubs for its middle school and high school students. One club is the online webstream program called CSPN (modeled after ESPN) in which sporting events and other activities are livestreamed on the web. Students participate as commentators, analysts, cameramen, and the tech crew.

=== Community service ===
Chaminade requires all students to participate in community service projects annually. Middle school students (grades 6–8) complete 10–20 hours annually while high school students complete 25–50 hours each year. Students help numerous groups throughout the St. Louis area. Some Spring Break community service trips have been to "Coal Country" (West Virginia), as well as Mexico, Africa, and Haiti. It also includes a Global Citizens Club, and membership in the St. Louis Mosaic Ambassador School program.

=== The House System ===
Chaminade began The House System in 2003. Chaminade has five houses, and each student belongs to one of the five Houses: Gray, Lamourous, Mauclerc, Meyer and O'Donnell.

- Gray House is named after C. Vincent Gray, the first African American Marianist in the St. Louis Province of the Society of Mary.
- Lamourous House is named after Marie Therese de Lamourous. She and her family were close friends of Blessed Chaminade and provided shelter for him during his persecution at the time of the French Revolution. Marie Therese and her family were closely involved in the Blessed Chaminade's early Sodalities and his work to re-Christianize France after the revolution.
- Mauclerc House is named after Reverend Francis Xavier Mauclerc, S.M., who was the first Marianist to be ordained in the United States. Originally from France, Rev. Mauclerc joined the Marianists as a seminarian in 1850, and was ordained in 1852.
- Meyer House is named after Father Leo Meyer, S.M., who was the first Marianist in the United States. Father Meyer arrived from Switzerland in 1849, settling in the Archdiocese of Cincinnati where he founded St. Mary's Institute, which later became the University of Dayton.
- O'Donnell House is named after Brother John O'Donnell, S.M., a working brother for the Society of Mary. He died in 1973 at the age of 90.

== Notable alumni ==
- Austin Allen, baseball player
- Tom Barlow, American soccer player for MLS's New York Red Bulls
- Bradley Beal, guard for NBA's Los Angeles Clippers; third overall selection of 2012 NBA draft for the Washington Wizards
- Ben Bishop, former goalie for NHL's Dallas Stars
- Chris Butler, former defenseman for NHL's St. Louis Blues
- Brady Cook, NFL quarterback
- Tyler Cook, former forward in the NBA
- Brad Davis, retired midfielder for MLS's Houston Dynamo and Sporting Kansas City
- John Doerr, billionaire venture capitalist
- Jericole Hellems, professional basketball player
- Mike Kehoe, 58th Governor of Missouri
- Neil Komadoski, hockey player, Bradshaw Cup champion
- David Lee, former forward in the NBA; member of 2015 NBA champion Golden State Warriors; drafted by New York Knicks; inductee in Florida Gators Hall of Fame
- Jack Lynn, professional soccer player
- Edward N. Peters, canonist and Referendary of Apostolic Signatura
- Michael Roach, American soccer and indoor soccer player
- David Roth, American professional soccer player
- Albert Schweitzer, cartoonist for the St. Louis Post-Dispatch
- Paul Stastny, former center in the NHL
- Yan Stastny, center for Thomas Sabo Ice Tigers of Deutsche Eishockey Liga
- Bill Steltemeier, founding President of Eternal Word Television Network (EWTN); CEO of EWTN 2000-09
- Jayson Tatum, forward for Boston Celtics, third player selected in 2017 NBA draft, 2024 NBA champion
- Brady Tkachuk, left wing for NHL's Ottawa Senators
- Matthew Tkachuk, left wing for NHL's Florida Panthers, Stanley Cup champion
- Chad Vandegriffe, American soccer and indoor soccer player
- Paul Virant, Chicago-area chef and restaurateur
- Chris Wideman, defenseman for NHL's Montreal Canadiens
- Joe Willis, goalkeeper for MLS's Nashville SC
