= St. John Vianney High School (Missouri) =

Private high school in Kirkwood, Missouri, US

Location
- 1311 South Kirkwood Road; Kirkwood, Missouri 63122; United States; 38°33′38″N 90°24′29″W

Information
- Type: Private, all-boys
- Motto: Italian: Verso l'alto (To the highest)
- Religious affiliation: Roman Catholic
- Established: 1960; 66 years ago
- President: Ian Mulligan
- Principal: Will Armon
- Grades: 9–12
- Student to teacher ratio: 12:1
- Campus size: 37 acres
- Colors: Black and gold
- Slogan: Men of Character and Accomplishment
- Athletics conference: Metro Catholic Conference
- Nickname: Golden Griffins
- Rival: Chaminade, SLUH
- Accreditation: Cognia
- Newspaper: The Griffin
- Yearbook: The Talon
- Tuition: $18,950
- Sister Schools: Notre Dame, Ursuline
- Dean of Students: Scott Hingle
- Admissions: Director, Tom Mulvihill
- Athletics: Director, Michael Potsou
- Website: vianney.com

St. John Vianney High School (known simply as Vianney High School or Vianney) is a Marianist private, all-boys Catholic college-preparatory school in Kirkwood, Missouri. The school was opened in 1960 by the Society of Mary, a religious order of priests and brothers who continue to run the school, and is part of the Archdiocese of Saint Louis, along with the Marianists' Chaminade College Preparatory School and St. Mary's South Side Catholic High School.

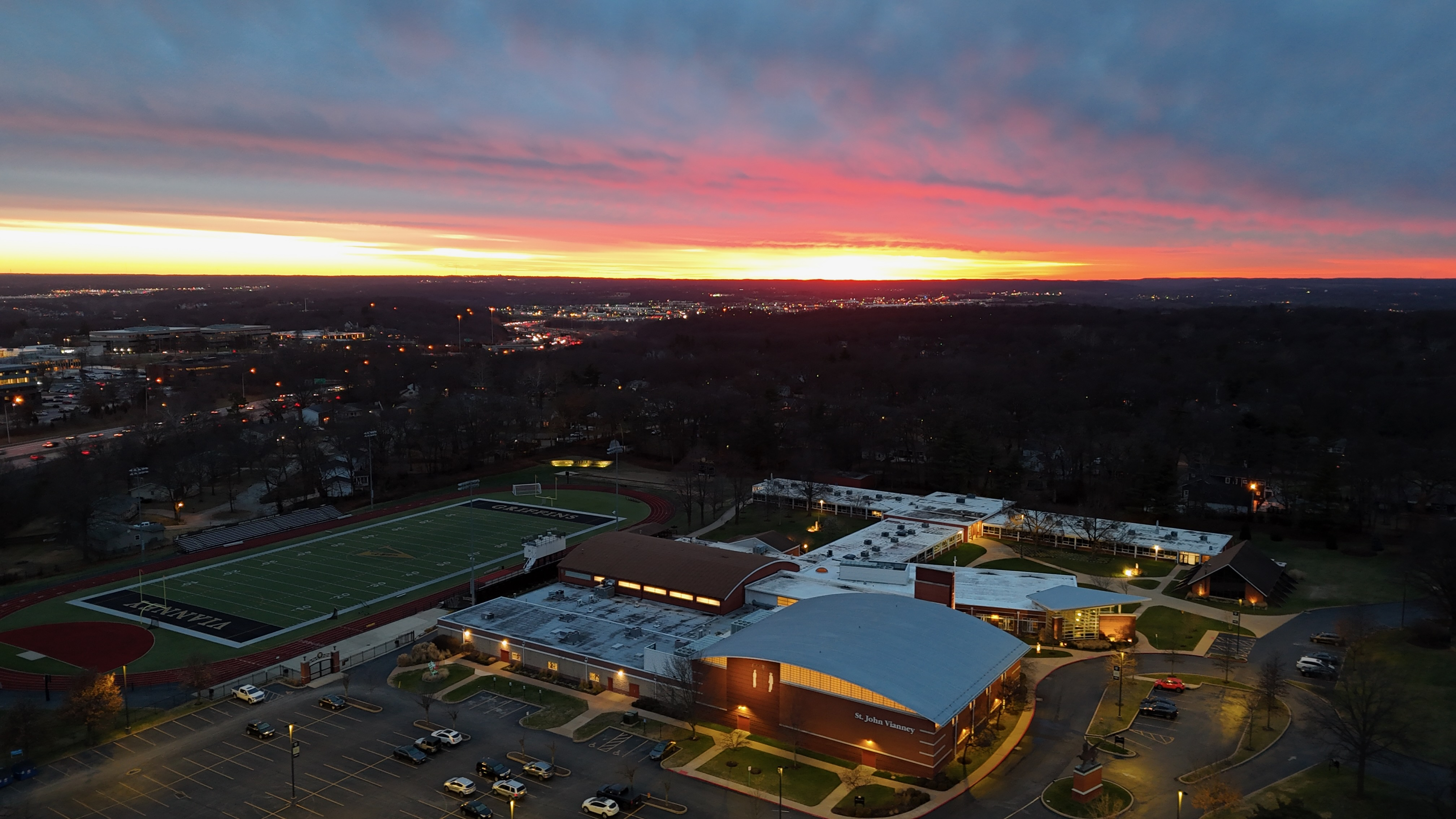
St. John Vianney High School Campus

== History ==
The creation of a new school was needed in the late 1950s to accommodate the increasing population of Baby Boomers. It was founded by Archbishop Joseph Ritter as a private, Marianist, Catholic high school for boys. The school has grown over time, changed its curriculum and adapted to educational trends.

Some of the notable events include the introduction of female teachers in 1973, lighting of the football field in 1977, and sale of part of the campus to Lutheran Church in 1980. The school has undergone several expansions and renovations including a new entrance, commons area, media center and state-of-the-art classrooms added in 2007. Subsequent updates included improvements to sports facilities, STEM labs, baseball fields and creation of an Esports Center in 2021.

Major renovations include a $1 million STEM labs upgrade. The most recent renovation in 2021 involved converting original locker rooms and weight rooms into a modern facility for student training that includes unique locker rooms, fitness equipment and dressing rooms for Griffin Theatre.

== Athletics ==
Vianney sponsors athletic teams in football, soccer, cross country, basketball, swimming, wrestling, baseball, golf, tennis, track and field, volleyball. There are also club teams for outdoor lacrosse, bowling, chess, lacrosse, racquetball and ice hockey.

In 2011 and 2013, the Varsity Chess Team won the National Championships.

Vianney is a member of the Metro Catholic Conference of private Catholic high schools, along with:

- De Smet Jesuit High School
- Christian Brothers College High School
- Chaminade College Preparatory School
- St. Louis University High School

State championships

- Esports - 2023 (Rocket League)
- Baseball – 2004, 2006, 2018
- Football – 2016, 2018
- Hockey – 1979, 1996, 2020
- Soccer – 1978, 1980, 1981, 1982, 1987, 1991, 1992
- Volleyball – 1989, 1991, 1992, 1994, 1995, 1997, 1998, 1999, 2000, 2001, 2002, 2004, 2005, 2006, 2010, 2011, 2013

National championships

- Chess – 2011, 2013
- Soccer – 1992

== School mascot ==
The school mascot is the Golden Griffin: half lion and half eagle. The school colors, black and gold, reflect the colors of the Griffin. The school states that the Griffin represents certain virtues in all of its students.

== Controversy ==
In 2006, Vianney President Fr. Robert Osborne (1933–2014) was accused in a civil lawsuit of sexual misconduct with a student. Osborne stepped down temporarily, then the school fired him after another accuser stepped forward. The school later settled the lawsuit for an undisclosed amount. Osborne was investigated by the Kirkwood Police but not charged with a crime. A subsequent Marianist investigation found "no credible or substantiated allegation of abuse", but the following year, the order stripped him of his priestly faculties.

In 2023, a nurse at the school was terminated from her position for inappropriate contact with a student. St. Louis County later charged her with two felony sex crimes, pleaded guilty, and was given a suspended five-year sentence and registered as a sex offender.

== Notable alumni ==
=== Sports and entertainment ===
- Matt Cepicky, former MLB player (Montreal Expos, Florida Marlins)
- Scott Cepicky, Minor League Baseball player (Chicago White Sox) and Republican politician
- Tim Dunigan, actor
- Neil Fiala, MLB player (St. Louis Cardinals, Cincinnati Reds)
- James Gladstone, general manager for the Jacksonville Jaguars
- Trent Green, former NFL quarterback
- Mark Lamping, president, St. Louis Cardinals Major League Baseball Club (2006 World Champions)
- Kyle Markway, Cleveland Browns tight end
- Dan McLaughlin, St. Louis Cardinals radio and television broadcaster
- Tom Mullen, NFL offensive lineman
- Cliff Politte, Major League Baseball pitcher
- Nick Schmidt, Major League Baseball pitcher
- Mark Segbers, soccer player
- Scott Touzinsky, US Volleyball Olympian, outside hitter, 2008 Beijing Games gold medalist
- Erik Ustruck, midfielder, Houston Dynamo
- Kyren Williams, American football running back, Los Angeles Rams
- Tony Williams, soccer player

=== Arts and sciences ===
- Bob Cassilly, founder of St. Louis City Museum
- Michael Wendl, Human Genome Project scientist
- Donald K. Anton, professor

=== Law and government ===
- Scott Cepicky, Tennessee House of Representatives

== Notable faculty ==
- John Hamman (1927—2000), American close-up magician and educator
- Steve Bieser, American baseball player
- Cole McNary, American educator, politician
