= Chris Butler (ice hockey) =

American ice hockey player (born 1986)

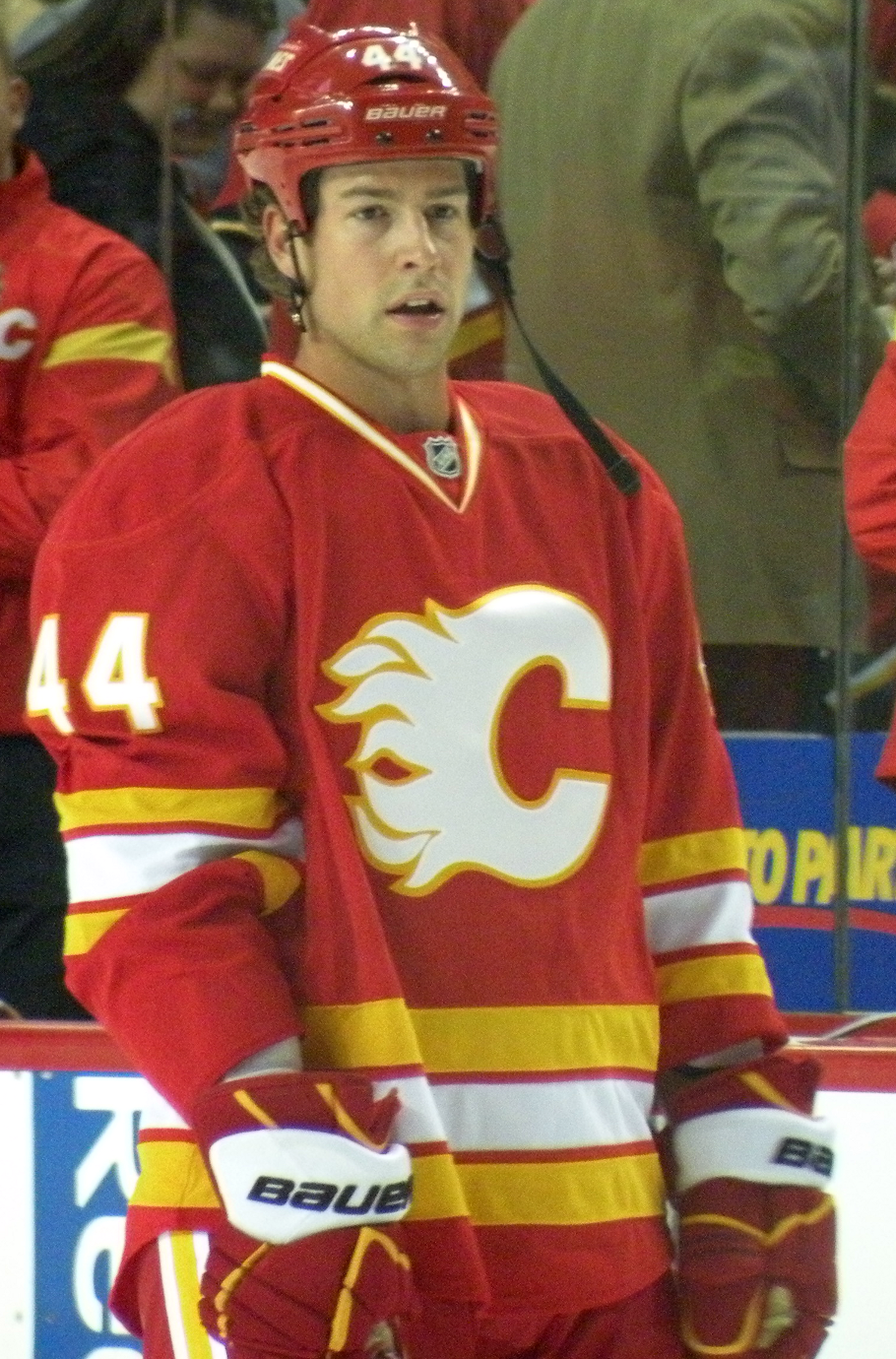
- Butler with the Calgary Flames in 2011
- Born: October 27, 1986 (age 39) St. Louis, Missouri, U.S.
- Height: 6 ft 1 in (185 cm)
- Weight: 203 lb (92 kg; 14 st 7 lb)
- Position: Defense
- Shot: Left
- Played for: Buffalo Sabres; Calgary Flames; St. Louis Blues
- National team: United States
- NHL draft: 96th overall, 2005; Buffalo Sabres
- Playing career: 2008–2019

Chris Butler (born October 27, 1986) is an American former professional ice hockey defenseman who played in the National Hockey League (NHL) with the Buffalo Sabres, Calgary Flames and hometown club, St. Louis Blues. Butler was a fourth round selection of the Sabres, chosen 96th overall at the 2005 NHL entry draft. He then played three seasons at the University of Denver before turning professional in 2008.

== Early life ==
Butler grew up in Kirkwood, Missouri, playing both hockey and baseball. He attended Chaminade College Preparatory School (Missouri) for high school. His father Doug was also a professional hockey player, drafted by the NHL's Boston Bruins and the Calgary Cowboys of the World Hockey Association in 1977, and played parts of three seasons in the American Hockey League (AHL). Doug coached his son as the younger Butler grew up. Chris's mother, Martha, was also an athlete who played field hockey while she attended college in St. Louis.

== Playing career ==
=== Junior and college ===
Butler played high school hockey in St. Louis for Chaminade College Prep., one season in Junior B followed by two seasons with the Sioux City Musketeers of the United States Hockey League (USHL). He led the Musketeers with a +36 plus-minus rating in 2004–05, played in the league's All-Star Game and was named to the first All-Star team following the season. He was then selected by the Buffalo Sabres, 96th overall, in the 2005 NHL entry draft but first committed to attend and play hockey at the University of Denver.

In his first season with the Denver Pioneers, Butler was selected to join the United States junior team at the 2006 World Junior Ice Hockey Championships. He played four games for the fourth place Americans. Butler spent three seasons with the Pioneers, scoring 20 goals and 66 points in that time. He was the team's assistant captain in 2007–08 and was considered the team's top defenseman while being named an All-American. Butler left the Pioneers following his junior season, signing an entry-level contract with the Sabres.

=== Professional ===
Butler began the 2008–09 season with the Sabres' AHL affiliate, the Portland Pirates. He appeared in 27 games for the Pirates and scored 12 points when he was recalled to Buffalo on December 18, 2008. He made his NHL debut the following night against the Los Angeles Kings, a 5–0 victory in which he scored his first NHL point with an assist on a goal by Adam Mair. He scored his first goal on March 20, 2009, against Martin Biron of the Philadelphia Flyers. Butler appeared in 47 games for the Sabres in his rookie season, scoring two goals and four assists.

An ankle injury forced Butler out of the Sabres' lineup for 12 games in 2009–10, but he posted improved offensive numbers, scoring 21 points in 59 games. Still, he found himself marginalized by the Sabres late in the season, and stated himself that he lacked consistency in his play in 2010–11. He appeared in 49 games for the Sabres, and while his offensive production dropped to nine points, he improved his plus-minus to +8 after finishing −15 the year previous. Following the season, however, Butler was packaged in a deal that saw him dealt to the Calgary Flames along with Paul Byron on June 25, 2011, in exchange for Robyn Regehr, Ales Kotalik and a second round pick in the 2012 NHL entry draft. The Flames quickly signed him to a two-year, US$2.5 million contract. During his tenure with the Flames, Butler tied a dubious plus-minus record, finishing -7 during a January 5, 2012 game against the Boston Bruins.

On July 16, 2014, Butler signed as a free agent to a one-year, two-way contract with the hometown club, the St. Louis Blues. On July 1, 2015, Butler re-signed with the Blues on a one-year, one-way contract worth $675,000. Butler familiarly agree to remain with the Blues to following season, agreeing in free agency to return for a third season on July 2, 2016.

In his fifth season within the Blues organization in the 2018–19 season, Butler continued as a veteran presence in the AHL while splitting the year between the San Antonio Rampage and the Blues. He made 13 regular season appearances with St. Louis, contributing with 1 goal and 2 points. He was a part of the extended playoff squad for the Blues, and as a part of the Blues first Stanley Cup championship he skated with cup following the Stanley Cup Finals Game 7 victory over the Boston Bruins.

On July 3, 2019, Butler reportedly retired from hockey after 11 professional seasons.

== Coaching career ==
Bulter remained within hockey in accepting an amateur scouting role with the Arizona Coyotes organization for the 2021–22 season. After a lone season with the Coyotes, on August 8, 2022, Butler moved to the Pittsburgh Penguins organization after he was announced as a player development coach, to help develop defensive prospects.

== Career statistics ==
=== Regular season and playoffs ===
			Regular season					Playoffs
Season	Team	League	GP	G	A	Pts	PIM	GP	G	A	Pts	PIM
2001–02	Chaminade College	HS-MO		1	3	4		—	—	—	—	—
2002–03	St. Louis Jr. Blues	CSHL	44	2	12	14	35	—	—	—	—	—
2002–03	Chaminade College	HS-MO		0	1	1		—	—	—	—	—
2003–04	Sioux City Musketeers	USHL	55	3	6	9	37	7	0	1	1	6
2004–05	Sioux City Musketeers	USHL	60	6	22	28	90	13	1	6	7	10
2005–06	University of Denver	WCHA	35	7	15	22	28	—	—	—	—	—
2006–07	University of Denver	WCHA	39	10	17	27	42	—	—	—	—	—
2007–08	University of Denver	WCHA	41	3	14	17	38	—	—	—	—	—
2008–09	Portland Pirates	AHL	27	2	10	12	14	4	0	0	0	0
2008–09	Buffalo Sabres	NHL	47	2	4	6	18	—	—	—	—	—
2009–10	Buffalo Sabres	NHL	59	1	20	21	22	—	—	—	—	—
2010–11	Buffalo Sabres	NHL	49	2	7	9	26	7	0	1	1	10
2011–12	Calgary Flames	NHL	68	2	13	15	34	—	—	—	—	—
2012–13	Karlskrona HK	Allsv	5	0	0	0	8	—	—	—	—	—
2012–13	Calgary Flames	NHL	44	1	7	8	19	—	—	—	—	—
2013–14	Calgary Flames	NHL	82	2	14	16	39	—	—	—	—	—
2014–15	St. Louis Blues	NHL	33	3	6	9	23	—	—	—	—	—
2014–15	Chicago Wolves	AHL	14	1	8	9	6	—	—	—	—	—
2015–16	Chicago Wolves	AHL	46	4	14	18	39	—	—	—	—	—
2015–16	St. Louis Blues	NHL	5	0	0	0	4	—	—	—	—	—
2016–17	Chicago Wolves	AHL	72	5	21	26	46	9	1	5	6	4
2016–17	St. Louis Blues	NHL	1	0	0	0	0	—	—	—	—	—
2017–18	San Antonio Rampage	AHL	61	8	21	29	22	—	—	—	—	—
2017–18	St. Louis Blues	NHL	6	0	0	0	2	—	—	—	—	—
2018–19	St. Louis Blues	NHL	13	1	1	2	0	—	—	—	—	—
2018–19	San Antonio Rampage	AHL	51	2	19	21	40	—	—	—	—	—
NHL totals			407	14	72	86	187	7	0	1	1	10
AHL totals			271	22	93	115	167	13	1	5	6	4

=== International ===
Medal record

Representing the United States

Ice hockey

Ice Hockey World Championships
Bronze medal – third place	2013 Sweden/Finland	

Year	Team	Event	Result	GP	G	A	Pts	PIM
2006	United States	WJC	4th	4	0	0	0	2
2012	United States	WC	7th	8	1	1	2	0
2013	United States	WC	3rd place, bronze medalist(s)	10	0	2	2	0
Junior totals				4	0	0	0	2
Senior totals				18	1	3	4	0

== Awards and honors ==
Award	Year
College
All-WCHA Rookie Team	2006
All-WCHA Second Team	2008
AHCA West Second-Team All-American	2008
WCHA All-Tournament Team	2008
