= Education in St. Louis =

Education in St. Louis is provided by the St. Louis Public Schools, private schools, charter schools, several colleges and universities, and the St. Louis Public Library.

== Primary and secondary education ==
The St. Louis Public Schools (SLPS) is the only school district in St. Louis. It operates more than 75 schools, including several magnet schools. SLPS operates under provisional accreditation from the state of Missouri and is under the governance of a state-appointed school board called the Special Administrative Board, although a local board continues to exist without legal authority over the district. Since 2000, charter schools have operated in the city of St. Louis using authorization from Missouri state law. These schools are sponsored by local institutions or corporations and take in students from kindergarten through high school. In addition, several private schools exist in the city, and the Archdiocese of St. Louis operates dozens of parochial schools in the city, including parochial high schools.

Several secular private schools also exist in the city, such as Crossroads College Preparatory School.

Missouri School for the Blind, a state-operated K-12 boarding school, is in the city.

== Colleges and universities ==
The city of St. Louis is home to many universities and colleges, including Saint Louis University, the University of Missouri-St. Louis, Harris-Stowe State University, Washington University in St. Louis (although part of Washington University is located in adjacent Clayton, Missouri), and Stevens Institute of Business and Arts.

According to William Barnaby Faherty, Rev. Peter Verhaegen, SJ., was a key leader in building Catholicism in the West from his arrival 1823 to his death in 1853. As the first Jesuit president of St. Louis College, he Americanized the Jesuits, created a curriculum to fit frontier needs, integrated the school into Catholic life, moved the school to a bigger campus, and established a medical department.

== Libraries ==
The St. Louis Public Library operates 16 branches and a central library building, and it maintains a borrowing agreement with the adjacent St. Louis County Library.

== Miscellaneous education ==
The St. Louis Japanese School, a Japanese weekend supplementary school holding classes for Japanese Americans and Japanese nationals, holds its classes at Webster University in nearby Webster Groves, Missouri.

== See also ==
- Education in Missouri
- History of education in Missouri
- List of high schools in Greater St. Louis
- List of colleges and universities in Greater St. Louis
