= List of colleges and universities in Greater St. Louis =

This is a list of colleges and universities in Greater St. Louis. It includes public and private schools.

== Traditional colleges and universities ==
=== Private ===
- Lindenwood University
- Maryville University
- McKendree University
- Missouri Baptist University
- Principia College
- Saint Louis University
- Washington University in St. Louis
- Webster University

=== Public ===
- Harris-Stowe State University (HBCU)
- Southern Illinois University Edwardsville
- University of Missouri–St. Louis

=== Satellite campuses ===
- Central Methodist University
- Columbia College

=== Defunct ===
- Fontbonne University (closed in 2025)

== Special focus colleges and universities ==
- Goldfarb School of Nursing at Barnes-Jewish College
- Logan University
- Ranken Technical College
- University of Health Sciences and Pharmacy in St. Louis

== Community and junior colleges ==
- East Central College
- Jefferson College (Missouri)
- Lewis and Clark Community College
- St. Charles Community College
- St. Louis Community College
- Southwestern Illinois College

== Seminaries and Bible colleges ==
=== Accredited by The Association of Theological Schools ===
- Augustine Institute (Roman Catholic)
- Aquinas Institute of Theology (Roman Catholic)
- Concordia Seminary (Lutheran)
- Covenant Theological Seminary (Presbyterian)
- Eden Theological Seminary (United Church of Christ)
- Kenrick-Glennon Seminary (Roman Catholic)
- Urshan Graduate School of Theology (Pentecostal)

=== Accredited by the Association for Biblical Higher Education ===
- Brookes Bible College
- Midwest University (Korean evangelical)

=== Defunct ===
- St. Louis Christian College (merged with Central Christian College of the Bible in 2022)

== For-profit trade schools ==
- Chamberlain College of Nursing
- Midwest Institute
- St. Louis College of Health Careers
- Stevens Institute of Business and Arts

=== Defunct ===
- Lutheran School of Nursing (closed in 2022)

== See also ==
- Education in St. Louis, Missouri
- Education in Greater St. Louis
