= Girls Independent Schools League =

High school athletic conference in Greater St. Louis

- Association: MSHSAA
- Founded: July 1, 2023
- Founder: Jen Brooks
- Commissioner: Brian Kessler
- No. of teams: 9
- Region: Greater St. Louis
- Website: girlsindependentschoolsleague.com

The Girls Independent Schools League (GISL) is a high school athletic conference comprising private all-female Christian high schools located in the St. Louis, Missouri metro area.

== Member schools ==
School	Nickname	Colors	City	County	Type
Cor Jesu	Chargers		Affton	St. Louis	Private (girls)
Incarnate Word	Red Knights		Bel-Nor	St. Louis	Private (girls)
Nerinx Hall	Markers		Webster Groves	St. Louis	Private (girls)
Notre Dame	Rebels		Lemay	St. Louis	Private (girls)
St. Dominic (Note: St. Dominic High School is coeducational, but its girls teams compete in the GISL.)	Crusaders		O'Fallon	St. Charles	Private
St. Joseph's	Angels		Frontenac	St. Louis	Private (girls)
Ursuline	Bears		Glendale	St. Louis	Private (girls)
Villa Duchesne	Saints		Frontenac	St. Louis	Private (girls)
Visitation Academy	Vivettes		Town and Country	St. Louis	Private (girls)

== History ==
The GISL had its inaugural season in the 2023–24 school year.

The Metro Women's Athletics Association (MWAA) was a high school athletic conference comprising private all-female Catholic high schools for over 30 years. Before the establishment of the GISL, Cor Jesu, Incarnate Word, Nerinx Hall, St Joseph's, Ursuline, Villa Duchesne, and Visitation Academy were members of the MWAA. Additionally, Barat Academy and Whitfield School participated in sports as independent schools, but competed against the schools of the MWAA in some sports.
