= William Trowbridge =

William Trowbridge may refer to:

- William P. Trowbridge (1828–1892), American general, mechanical engineer, and naturalist
- William Trowbridge (poet) (born 1941), poet laureate for the state of Missouri
