= Villa Duchesne =

Private school in Frontenac, Missouri, US

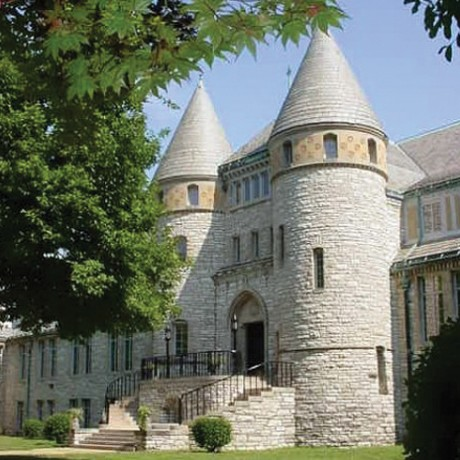
- 1929 Main Building of Villa Duchesne

Location
- 10801 Conway Road; Frontenac, Missouri 63131; United States; 38°38′37″N 90°24′59″W

Information
- Type: Private primary and secondary school
- Religious affiliation: Roman Catholic (Society of the Sacred Heart)
- Patron saint: St. Rose Philippine Duchesne
- Established: 1929; 97 years ago
- Oversight: Board of Trustees
- Head of school: Alice Dickherber
- Grades: JK3–12
- Gender: Girls (7–12); Coed (JK3–6)
- Enrollment: 584 (2025–26)
- Average class size: 16
- Student to teacher ratio: 7:1
- Campus size: 64 acres (26 ha)
- Colors: Maroon and navy
- Athletics conference: GISL
- Mascot: Sophie the Squirrel
- Nickname: Saints
- Accreditation: ISACS
- Newspaper: Tower Talk
- Yearbook: Entre Nous
- Website: villa1929.org

Villa Duchesne, also known simply as Villa, is an independent, Roman Catholic school in Frontenac, Missouri, United States linked with 147 schools in 30 countries through the International Network of Sacred Heart Schools. Villa Duchesne is coed in preschool and elementary and all-girls in grades 7–12. The preschool/elementary program was formerly called Oak Hill School. The school was named for Sister Rose Philippine Duchesne.

Villa Duchesne places a large emphasis on tradition, specifically on Sacre Coeur and French tradition. Some traditions are the Saint Start-Up family picnic, may crownings, maypole, veneration of Mater Admirabilis, celebration of feast days, congé, and goûter.

== Athletics ==
Villa Duchesne sports include field hockey, volleyball, tennis, lacrosse, soccer, golf, basketball, swimming and diving, cross country, and track and field. In 2010, Villa Duchesne won the MSHSAA golf state championship. Villa Duchesne is also well known for its field hockey program, and the St. Joseph's vs. Villa Duchesne field hockey game is a popular rivalry game.

In 2011, Villa Duchesne captured the Missouri Class 3A Volleyball Championship led by a core group of seniors who helped the team to a 2nd-place finish in 2009.

While Villa's teams compete under the "Saints" name, it is not uncommon to see the school's mascot, Sophie the Squirrel, at home games and meets.

Reigning MSHSAA Field Hockey champions for the 2017 and 2018 seasons, defeating MICDS both years.

== Notable alumni ==
- Jacqueline Getty Phillips, Socialite and thoroughbred breeder
- Dave Holmes, TV personality, actor, blogger, writer
- Emily W. Murphy, attorney and administrator of the General Services Administration
- Brady Tkachuk, NHL player for the Florida Panthers
- Matthew Tkachuk, NHL player for the Florida Panthers
