= Cor Jesu Academy =

Private, all-female school in Affton, Missouri, United States

Location
- 10230 Gravois Road; Affton, (St. Louis County), Missouri 63123; United States; 38.5468°N 90.3445°W

Information
- Type: Private college-preparatory school
- Motto: "Sharing the Love of the Heart of Christ"
- Religious affiliation: Catholic
- Established: 1956; 70 years ago
- CEEB code: 262947
- President: Sr. Susan Marie Krupp
- Principals: Meghan Bohac and Kathleen Wobbe Pottinger
- Faculty: 54
- Grades: 9–12
- Gender: Girls
- Enrollment: 575 (2021)
- Student to teacher ratio: 10:1
- Colors: Red and white
- Athletics conference: GISL
- Nickname: Chargers
- Rival: St. Joseph's Academy
- Accreditation: Cognia
- Newspaper: Corette
- Yearbook: Corde
- Tuition: $17,325 (2021-22)
- Website: corjesu.org

Cor Jesu Academy (abbreviated CJA or CJ) is a Catholic college-preparatory school for young women located in Affton, Missouri, in the Archdiocese of St. Louis. It was founded in 1956 by the Apostles of the Sacred Heart.

== History ==
Originally located in the Italian Hill district of St. Louis, its first principal was Sr. Anita Marie Giampetro. Cor Jesu moved to its present location on Gravois Road in Affton in 1965. An expanded Library-Fine Arts Center was completed in 1987. In 2005, expansion was completed with a new front entrance and courtyard, along with a new building called Clelian Hall. The library and broadcast studio were renovated in the summer of 2012. In the fall of 2012, 10 acres of land were purchased in auction by Cor Jesu. This land increased the campus size to a total of 29 acres, and was the first addition to the property since 2008, when the 6 acres in front of the newly acquired land was purchased. On top of this land, construction management company S. M. Wilson & Co built a $8.9 million dollar gymnasium. This gym added a new student commons, four new classrooms, offices, locker rooms, and a dance studio. This project added 40,000 square feet to the building's footprint.

During a June 9–17, 2012, tour in Rome, the Cor Jesu Academy choir performed for Pope Benedict XVI during the June 13 papal audience and was the principal choir for a Mass at the Altar of the Chair in St. Peter's Basilica, singing the liturgy for the feast of the Sacred Heart at Santa Croce. It also presented a formal concert at St. Ignatius Church in Rome and sang at a liturgy at the Basilica of St. Francis in Assisi.

== Academics ==
In order to be considered for admission to the school, students must score in the eighty-fifth percentile or above in a standardized test such as the Iowa Test of Basic Skills. In addition to its college preparatory courses, Cor Jesu offers Advanced College Credit courses to juniors and seniors in conjunction with St. Louis University and University of Missouri–St. Louis along with Advanced Placement courses in History, Government, English, Spanish, French, Latin, Math, and Science.

Cor Jesu students average a score of 29 on the ACT, nine points above the national average. According to St Louis Magazine, the average score of 29 was the highest for an all-girls Catholic High School. Cor Jesu consistently has among the highest ACT scores in St Louis. Since the 2000-2001 school year, Cor Jesu has had 21 National Merit Finalists and 45 National Merit Commended Students. Ninety-nine percent of Cor Jesu students continue on to college or university studies.

Cor Jesu has been accredited by the North Central Association since 1971. In 1990–91, Cor Jesu was named a Blue Ribbon School of Excellence by the U.S. Department of Education.

== Athletics ==
Sports programs for students at Cor Jesu include: cross country, field hockey, softball, volleyball, golf, and tennis in the fall; basketball, swimming, and cheerleading in the winter; and soccer, lacrosse, and track and field in the spring. The school has won state championships in several sports, and were in 2012 the Midwest field hockey champions, state champions in soccer, and also national high school champions in racquetball.

=== State championships ===
- Basketball: 1995
- Field hockey: 1982, 2002, 2004, 2005, 2006, 2012
- Lacrosse: 2016
- Racquetball: 2007, 2008, 2011–2016, 2021
- Soccer: 1985, 2012, 2024
- Softball: 1989
- Swim and Dive: 2017, 2018, 2019, 2021
- Volleyball: 1995, 2000, 2001, 2002, 2021

=== National championships ===
- Racquetball: 2007, 2009, 2011, 2012

== Notable alumnae ==
- Laura Cooper, Deputy Assistant Secretary of Defense for Russia, Ukraine, Eurasia
- Niele Ivey, former Women's National Basketball Association (WNBA) player, head coach for the Notre Dame Fighting Irish women's basketball
- Heather Maclean, author and founder of Little Laureate
- Victoria Recaño, television correspondent for The Insider
- Ann Wagner, Republican US Representative from Missouri, 2nd District
