= David Clewell =

American poet (1955–2020)

- Born: February 11, 1955; New Brunswick, New Jersey, U.S.
- Died: February 15, 2020 (aged 65)
- Education: Highland Park High School; University of Wisconsin–Madison (BA); Washington University in St. Louis (MFA)
- Occupation: Poet
- Spouse: Patricia

David Clewell (February 11, 1955 – February 15, 2020) was an American poet and creative writing instructor at Webster University. From 2010 to 2012, he served as the Poet Laureate of Missouri.

== Life ==
Clewell was born in New Brunswick, New Jersey in 1955 and attended Highland Park High School, in nearby Highland Park, where he first developed an interest in poetry. He graduated from University of Wisconsin with a B.A. in English. In 1979, he moved to St. Louis, Missouri and earned an M.F.A. in writing from Washington University in St. Louis. In 1985, Clewell began teaching in the English Department at Webster University. A year later, he started the Webster University Visiting Writers Series, which he still coordinated until his death.

As an instructor at Webster University, Clewell taught courses on 19th- and 20th-century literature, as well as poetry workshops and seminars. In 2010, Missouri Governor Jay Nixon noted that Clewell "has a unique perspective on contemporary American life and the characters and ideas that loom large in our recent history."

Clewell is the author of 10 poetry collections and his work has appeared in over 50 journals and magazines, including Harper's, Poetry, The Kenyon Review, The Missouri Review, The Georgia Review, Ontario Review, New Letters, and Yankee. He has been nominated for the Pushcart Prize for poetry seven times.

He was the poet laureate for the state of Missouri, serving until 2012. He was succeeded by William Trowbridge.

He lived in Webster Groves, Missouri with his wife Patricia.

== Awards ==
- Pollak Poetry Prize for Now We're Getting Somewhere
- Lavan Poetry Prize from the Academy of American Poets
- 1989 National Poetry Series, for Blessings in Disguise
- 2017 Lifetime Achievement in the Arts from the Webster Groves (MO) Arts Commission

== Works ==
=== Poems ===
- "from Jack Ruby's America", Word Virtual, 1999
- "Not to Mention Love: A Heart for Patricia", Poets.org
- "On the Eve of His Retirement, the Weight-Guesser Goes All Out", Poetry Foundation, March 2000
- "The Accomplice", Counterbalance, April 9, 2007
- "Two Alley Songs for the Vegetable Man: St. Louis, MO", Poetry Foundation, January 1985

=== Poetry collections ===
- Room to Breathe. Pentagram Press. 1976. ISBN 978-0-915316-30-4.
- Blessings in Disguise. Penguin Books. 1991. ISBN 978-0-14-058672-5.
- Now We're Getting Somewhere. University of Wisconsin Press. 1994. ISBN 978-0-299-14414-2. "David Clewell."
- The conspiracy quartet. Garlic Press. 1997. ISBN 978-0-9643009-2-7.
- Jack Ruby's America. Garlic Press. 2000. ISBN 978-0-9643009-3-4.
- The Low End of Higher Things. University of Wisconsin Press. 2003. ISBN 978-0-299-18574-9.
- Taken Somehow By Surprise. University of Wisconsin Press. 2011. ISBN 978-0-299251-14-7.

=== Anthologies ===
- Naomi Shihab Nye; Paul B. Janeczko, eds. (1999). "Goodbye Note to Debbie Fuller: Pass It On". I Feel a Little Jumpy Around You: Paired Poems by Men & Women. Simon and Schuster. ISBN 978-0-689-81341-2.
- Laure-Anne Bosselaar, ed. (1999). Outsiders: poems about rebels, exiles, and renegades. Milkweed Editions. ISBN 978-1-57131-409-3.
- Billy Collins, ed. (2003). Poetry 180: a turning back to poetry. Random House Trade Paperbacks. ISBN 978-0-8129-6887-3.
- Jack Elliott Myers; Roger Weingarten, eds. (2005). New American poets. David R. Godine Publisher. ISBN 978-1-56792-302-5.
