= Stolen Memories: Secrets from the Rose Garden =

1996 American television film

- Genre: Drama
- Written by: Tim Cagney
- Directed by: Bob Clark
- Starring: Mary Tyler Moore; Linda Lavin; Nathan Watt; Wayne Grace; Paul Winfield; Shirley Knight
- Music by: Paul Zaza
- Country of origin: United States
- Original language: English

Production
- Executive producer: Linda Lavin
- Producer: Jack Lorenz
- Cinematography: Stephen M. Katz
- Editor: Stan Cole
- Running time: 100 minutes
- Production companies: Lavin Entertainment Group; MTM Enterprises

Original release
- Network: The Family Channel
- Release: January 7, 1996

Stolen Memories: Secrets from the Rose Garden is a 1996 American drama television film directed by Bob Clark and starring Mary Tyler Moore. Set in 1956, it involves Freddie Everett, a young boy who goes to visit his three aunts (Linda Lavin, Shirley Knight, and Mary Tyler Moore) for the summer at their home in the South.

The film was released on The Family Channel on January 7, 1996 and produced by The Family Channel Network, Lavin Entertainment, and MTM Enterprises.

== Plot ==
In 1956, after Freddie Everett's, a young nephew, visit creates Jessica's (Mary Tyler Moore) recollections of events that led to her mental disestablishment for the summer at their home in the south. Freddie becomes closest to Jessica, the childlike aunt with a troubled past, who teaches him about life and friendship.

== Production ==
Filming took place in Wilmington, North Carolina.
