= Poet Laureate of Missouri =

Missouri Poet Laureate
- Incumbent; Justin Hamm since October 1, 2025
- Appointer: Governor of Missouri
- Term length: Two years
- Formation: January 8, 2008
- First holder: Susan Louise Marsh (Note: Appointer: Poet Laureate League (1933)); Walter Bargen (Note: Appointer: Governor of Missouri (2008))

The poet laureate of Missouri, officially the Missouri poet laureate, is the official poet of the U.S. state of Missouri. The office was established in January 2008 by governor of Missouri Matt Blunt. (Note: Per Executive Order 08-01. Superseded by EO 09-28 and subsequently EO 16-06.)

The Missouri poet laureate is appointed by the governor of Missouri on recommendation of the Missouri Poet Laureate Advisory Committee, which was established in May 2016.

== List ==
No.	Name	Term	Appointed by	Ref.
1	Susan Louise Marsh	April 1933 – September 21, 1946 (death)	Poet Laureate League (Washington, D.C.)	
2	Walter Bargen	February 13, 2008 – January 2010	Matt Blunt	
3	David Clewell	March 3, 2010 – January 31, 2012	Jay Nixon	
4	William Trowbridge	April 13, 2012 – June 29, 2016	Jay Nixon	
5	Aliki Barnstone	June 30, 2016 – 2019	Jay Nixon	
6	Karen Craigo	November 2019 – June 2021	Mike Parson	
7	Maryfrances Wagner	July 1, 2021 – June 30, 2023	Mike Parson	
8	David L. Harrison	July 1, 2023 – September 30, 2025	Mike Parson	
9	Justin Hamm	October 1, 2025 – Incumbent	Mike Kehoe	

== See also ==
- List of U.S. state poets laureate
