= Plaza Frontenac =

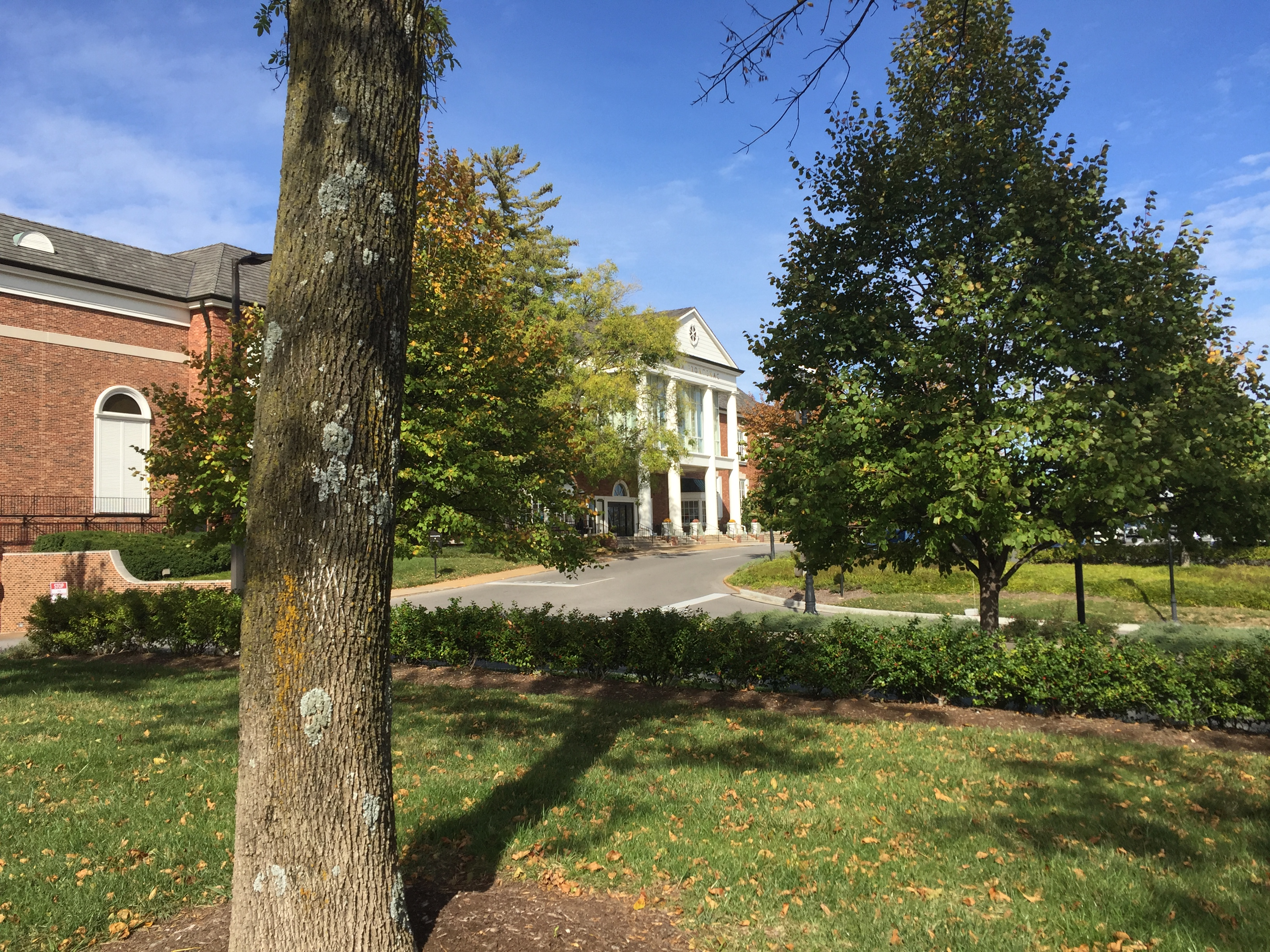
- Location: St. Louis, Missouri
- Coordinates: 38.6307°N 90.4074°W
- Opened: 1974
- Manager: GGP
- Owner: Brookfield Properties (50%), Canada Pension Plan Investment Board (50%)
- Num. of stores: 48
- Num. of anchor tenants: 2
- Floor area: 482,066 square feet (44,785.4 m^{2})
- Floors: 2
- Public transit: MetroBus
- Website: plazafrontenac.com

Plaza Frontenac is an upscale, two-level, enclosed, regional shopping center in Frontenac, Missouri. Opened in 1974 and anchored by Saks Fifth Avenue and Neiman Marcus, it has high-end tenants, many of which are unique to the region. Since 2018, Plaza Frontenac has been owned by a joint venture of Canada Pension Plan Investment Board and GGP, a subsidiary of Brookfield Properties.

== Tenants ==
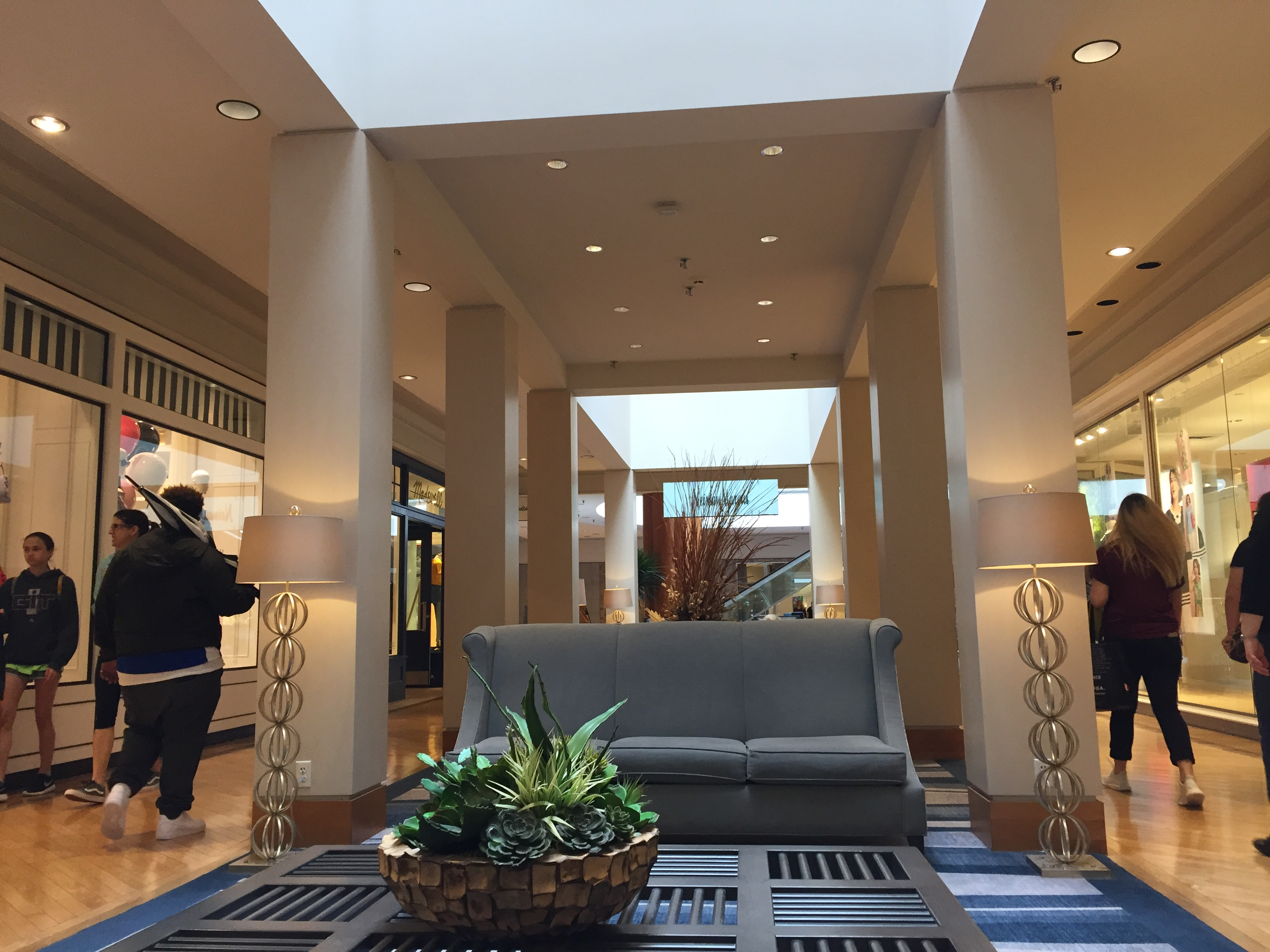
Interior, Plaza Frontenac

Plaza Frontenac has a mix of apparel, home goods, and specialty stores; and beauty services. The mall is anchored by Saks Fifth Avenue and Neiman Marcus. In 2011, it was one of nine U.S. to have both department stores as anchors.

As of 2025, other retailers include mostly national brands such as Allen Edmonds, Coach, Eileen Fisher, J. Crew, Gucci, Louis Vuitton, Lululemon Athletica, Alo Yoga, Golden Goose, Tecovas, Omega SA, David Yurman, Tiffany & Co., Tory Burch, Tumi, UNTUCKit, Vineyard Vines, and Williams Sonoma. As of 2025, restaurants at Plaza Frontenac include four out-parcel lots and range from casual to fine dining; restaurants include Canyon Cafe, Flower Child, BRIO! Tuscan Grille, BrickTop's, Fleming's Prime Steakhouse & Wine Bar, and Zodiac Room at Neiman Marcus.

The shopping center also has Landmark Plaza Frontenac Cinema, a six-screen theater that frequently screens independent and limited-release films.

== Location ==
Plaza Frontenac is located in the affluent St. Louis suburb of Frontenac, near the intersection of Highway 64 and South Lindbergh Boulevard, roughly 12 miles from downtown St. Louis. It is considered part of the "Mid-County" area but also borders "West County" and its communities of Clarkson Valley, Chesterfield, Ladue, and Creve Coeur, Missouri.

== History ==
The land on which Plaza Frontenac was built consisted largely of old-growth oak forest and a steeplechase course of the Bridlespur Hunt Club, founded by August A. Busch, Sr. in 1927. The Desloge family of St. Louis bought the land in the 1940s. The site connected to horse trails that connected to stables in the area, including Otis Brown Stables on Countryside Lane, the Palmer Stables, Clayton Hunt Club on Bridle Lane, and the St. Louis Country Club stables in Ladue. The Desloge family sold the development rights to a physicians group who sought to build medical buildings, but the group sold rights to the Capitol Land Company, a local real estate development company founded by George Capps and Herbert Wotka.

Capitol Land Company proceeded to build the Plaza Frontenac shopping mall on the land. The mall was designed to appeal to luxury shoppers from nearby affluent suburbs such as Ladue, Frontenac, Town & Country, and Kirkwood. The Colonial-inspired building featured fountains, wooden floors, and prominent staircases at each end. Neiman Marcus signed on to anchor the project as part of a national expansion, and the owners persuaded Saks Fifth Avenue, which had maintained a store in St. Louis' Central West End since the early 1950s, to move the store west to be a second anchor. The mall opened in 1974.

In 1994, the owners remodeled Plaza Frontenac, which was facing competition from St. Louis Galleria, a nearby mall that opened in 1984 and expanded in 1992. They hired Michael Mindlin and David Suttle of Hellmuth, Obata & Kassabaum, who developed a merchandising strategy and corresponding alterations. These included interior and exterior landscaping; new hardwood floors, paint, and fixtures; LED lighting; "hand-made custom carpets. imported European furniture in soft seating areas". Also added were a grand piano for live music, new services and amenities, including opulent women's restrooms and lounge with individual wood-lined restrooms. This produced a new mix of day spa, art theater, white-tablecloth restaurants (facing outward to create a new arrival experience) and home goods intended to retain older, affluent shoppers but also attract younger, more diverse customers. Over the next years, Mindlin and Suttle refined the concept as they launched their own strategic planning and design firm called Suttle Mindlin. The Urban Land Institute wrote that “the renovation puts Plaza Frontenac on the cutting edge of mall design". A new restaurant, Cardwell's at the Plaza, was designed to be hospitable to diners in suits and sweats alike.

By 2010, the property was owned by Davis Street Landing Company, which added two outparcel restaurants to the center, despite national economic conditions that were causing malls across the country to struggle. The addition brought total square footage to 482,843 and about 40 tenants.

In September 2011, Davis Street Properties sold Plaza Frontenac to a joint venture of General Growth Properties and Canada Pension Plan Investment Board. Average sales at the mall were about $500 per square foot, well above the national average. It was also 96% leased beyond the anchors. In 2013, it was reported that many local tenants were being replaced national chains, including Madewell and Athleta.

In 2014, the mall added Forever Flawless, Tory Burch, Mitchell Gold + Bob Wilson Signature Store, jeweler David Yurman, and Vineyard Vines' first Missouri store. The Louis Vuitton store was renovated and enlarged. GGP reported that tenant sales in 2013 increased to $564 per square foot.

On March 6, 2026, Saks Global announced the closure of 12 Saks Fifth Avenue and 3 Neiman Marcus locations nationwide in an effort to further cut costs and focus on more profitable locations, including the Saks store at Plaza Frontenac.
