= St. Louis Japanese School =

Japanese educational program in Missouri, USA

Coordinates: 38°35′18″N 90°20′47″W

- Japanese: セントルイス日本語教室

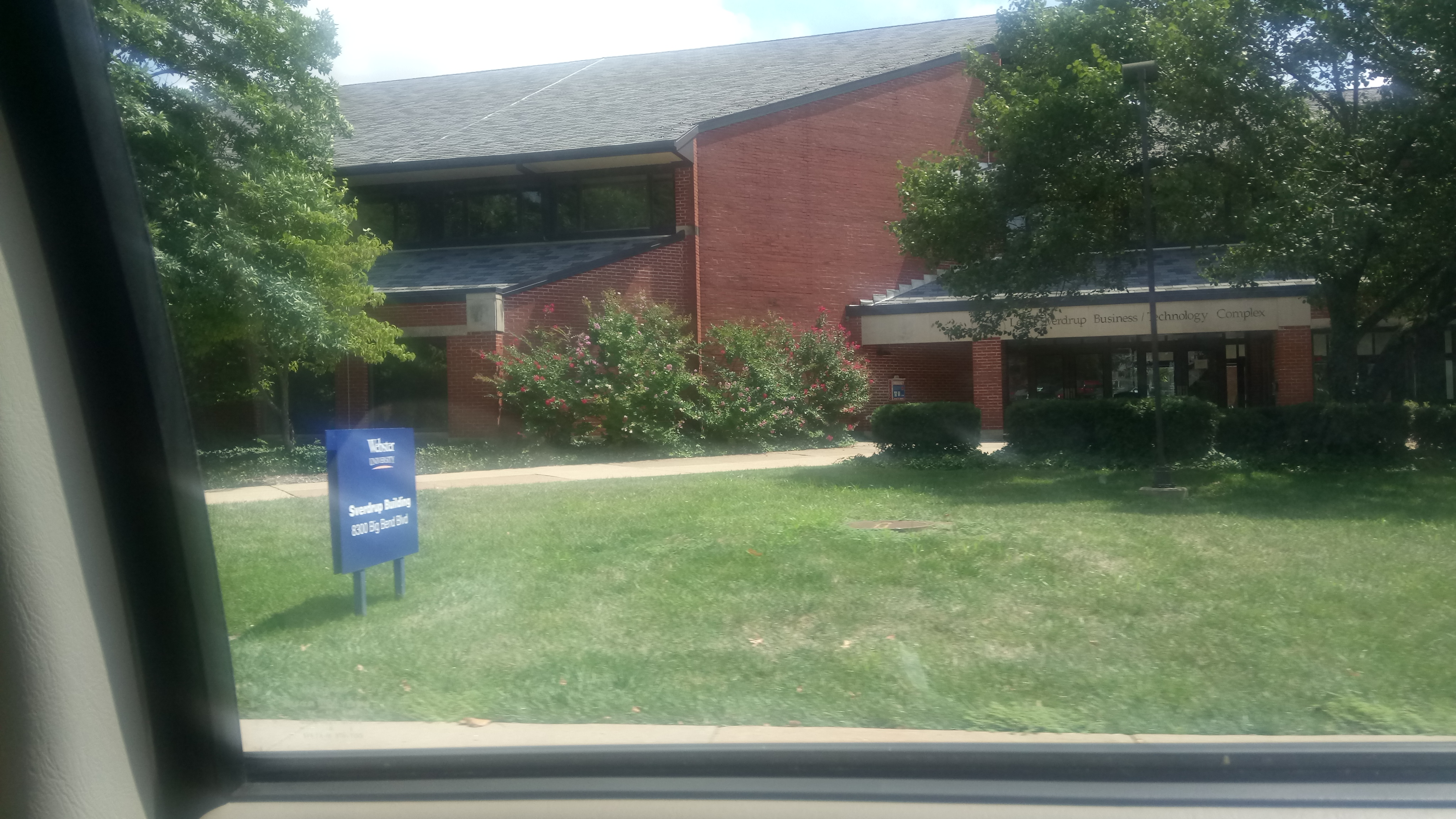
- Sverdrup Business/Technology Complex, where classes are held

Information
- Established: June 1978; 48 years ago
- Teaching staff: 14
- Enrollment: 100 (2006)
- Language: Japanese
- Website: www.stlnihongo.org

St. Louis Japanese School (セントルイス日本語教室 Santo Ruisu Nihongo Kyōshitsu "St. Louis Japanese Classroom") is a weekend Japanese educational program in the St. Louis metropolitan area. It focuses on teaching Japanese children Japanese, Math, Culture, History, and Geography. Classes are held at Webster University in Webster Groves, Missouri.

It is operated by the parents and supported by Consulate General of Chicago, Japanese Chamber of Commerce of St. Louis, and Japan America Society of St. Louis.

== History ==
St. Louis Japanese School was created in June, 1978.

Washington University's international house was the initial classroom location, with enrollment under 15. In 1986 SLJS had elementary and junior high school levels and held classes at the College School in Webster Groves. At one time it also held classes at Fontbonne University. In 1999 the Saturday school began holding classes at Webster University.

== Operations ==
In 2006, there were 100 students and 14 teachers, including the principal. The school year begins in April and ends in March. Every Saturday, the classes are held at the Sverdrup Business/Technology Complex at Webster University in Webster Groves, Missouri. The third floor of Webster Hall houses the language school's library and office, and classes were previously held on the third and fourth floors of Webster Hall. The university collects rent from the language school in exchange for the use of the facilities. Japanese international students attending classes at Webster university teach at the Saturday school.

== International classes ==
The International classes of St. Louis Japanese School provides an opportunity for children with other background to learn Japanese as a second language.

The purpose of the International classes of St. Louis Japanese School is to open the door to local young students in becoming familiar with the Japanese language and the culture.

The curriculum is understanding basic conversation and reading and writing basic Japanese characters. Students will also learn about Japanese culture and traditions by attending various activities at St. Louis Japanese School such as New Year's Celebration, Field day, Japanese Festival at the Botanical Garden, Writing an Essay Book, and Special Classes.

=== Semesters ===
(This school is based on the Japanese school year)

1st Semester: April–August (July, August in summer vacation)

2nd Semester: September–December

3rd Semester: January–March

Classes meet every Saturday morning.

The academic year has 44-47 lessons per year.

== See also ==
- Japanese language education in the United States
