= Susan Louise Marsh =

American activist, author, children's advocate

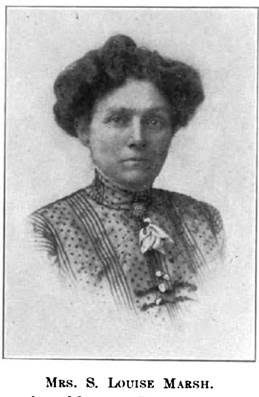
- featured in the Daughters of the American Revolution Magazine in 1913
- Born: April 23, 1867; Troy, Indiana
- Died: September 21, 1946 (aged 79); St. Louis, Missouri
- Occupations: Activist, Author

Susan Louise Marsh was an American activist, author, and children's advocate. Marsh is responsible for ending the sole guardianship laws in the state of Missouri through her persistent dedication for change. She was named Poet Laureate of Missouri in 1933 by the Poet Laureate League.

== Early life ==
Susan Louise Cotton Marsh was born on April 23, 1867, in Troy, Indiana. She was the daughter of Cullen Columbus Cotton & Ann Connot.

== Career ==
She later moved to Monet, Missouri where she married Eugene Marsh. The couple had two children, Eugenia and Wilbur, after they moved to Webster Groves, Missouri. Here, Marsh began her career of advocacy. Marsh was heavily involved as a member of the Webster Groves chapter of the Daughters of the American Revolution. She also advocated for the American Red Cross and the Navy League during World War 1. Other clubs she was a part of include, the Monday Club of Webster Groves, the Shakespeare Drama Study Club and Tercentenary Club, the American Literary League, the St. Louis Dante Club, the Daughters of 1812, the Colonial Dames of the 17th Century, Snider Association of Universal Culture, the League of Women Voters, the Republican Women's Club, the London Poetical Society and the National Society Magna Charta Dames. Marsh even began the St. Louis Branch of the National League of American Pen-Women. Her heavy involvement as an activist then led her into the political arena.

=== Political involvement ===
Marsh was bothered by the sole guardianship law that deemed men full custody of their children and the ability to take their child's wages. After hearing the story of a young girl in St. Louis who was forced to give her alcoholic father all of her earned money, Marsh decided to provoke change. However, at the time, the state of Missouri did not allow women to take part in political matters. In order to push the law to the Missouri Senate, Marsh had to find a man who would draft and advocate for the law. Luckily, Marsh had a variety of connections to look into. Missouri legislator Alroy Phillips became the spokesman who would address the Senate with the Joint Guardianship Law.

=== The Marsh Joint Guardianship Law ===
The Marsh Joint Guardianship Law is formally known as, Guardians and Curators of Minors-Granting Married Women Equal Rights With Husbands in Care of Minor children and Management of Their Estates. The act is divided into seven sections: The first, who were natural guardians of minors. The second, married woman may be curators and guardians. Third, minors, by whom bound. The fourth, executor may bind child, when. The fifth, services and earnings of minor children-custody and control of. Sixth, rights of parents equal, in custody or control of minor children, of their services and earnings-court to adjudicate. Finally the seventh, inconsistent acts repealed.

==== Proposal ====
Sixteen states had already adopted the Joint Guardianship law, and Marsh would go on to make Missouri the seventeenth. On October 12, 1912, Marsh presented the idea of the law to the Daughters of the American Revolution. With widespread support by the Douglas Oliver chapter of the D.A.R., the act was presented to the D.A.R. state conference in Kansas City, Missouri. Again, there was great agreement that the law of sole guardianship should be changed. Thanks to the rich influence of representation attributed to the D.A.R., six thousand women pledged to the bill. The movement began to pick up speed, and finally, the old law was repealed. The next step for Marsh was to get the new law implemented. Marsh prepared an eight page long proposal that explained the reasoning behind the cause. After review, the Missouri State Senate passed the new law on March 20, 1913. The act also included a new law to those who are mentally unstable, known as: Guardians and Curators of Insane Persons-Facts Inquires Into by Court Sitting as a Jury. This law was passed on March 18, 1913.

=== Literary contributions ===
After her political contributions in 1913, Marsh began to write. Perhaps the most famous work of Marsh's is Young Abe Lincoln; a cotton bowl of Lincoln stories founded on tradition, narrated by Aunt Ann of Indiana. Published in 1929, the story was meant as a persuasion to implement a proposed memorial for Lincoln and his family in Spencer, Indiana. Marsh also wrote Missouri Anthology (1936) with Charles Garrett Vannest. Among her many achievements, she received the honor of "Missouri's Poet Laureate" in 1928 by the St. Louis chapter of the Daughters of 1812.

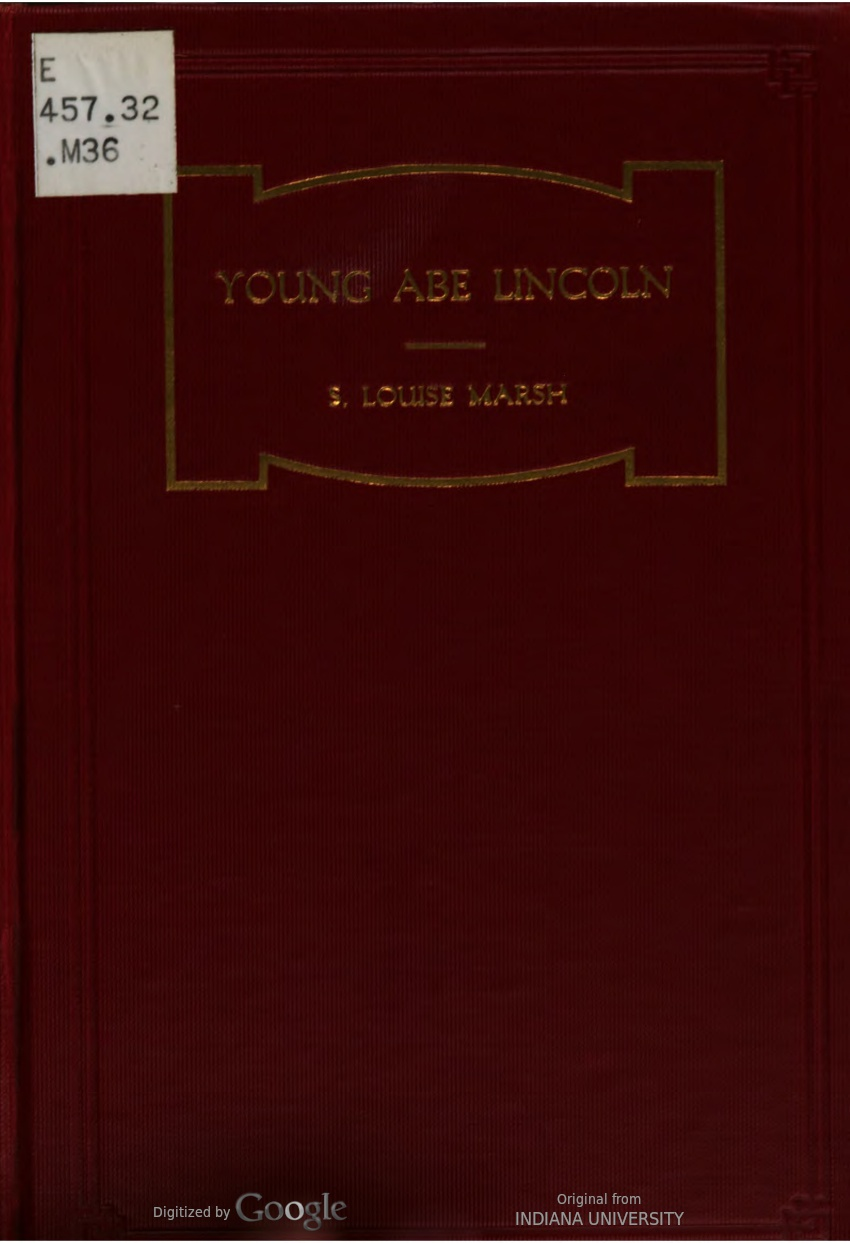
Young Abe Lincoln

== Death ==
After fighting against heart disease, Marsh was moved to Bethesda General Hospital in St. Louis, Missouri. She remained there for 22 days until she suffered from cardiac decompensation and passed on September 21, 1946. She is buried at Bellefontaine Cemetery in St. Louis in the same lot as her husband and other relatives including Olydia, Frank, Mildred, and Angeline Marsh.
