= St. Louis County Library =

Public library in St. Louis County, Missouri, United States

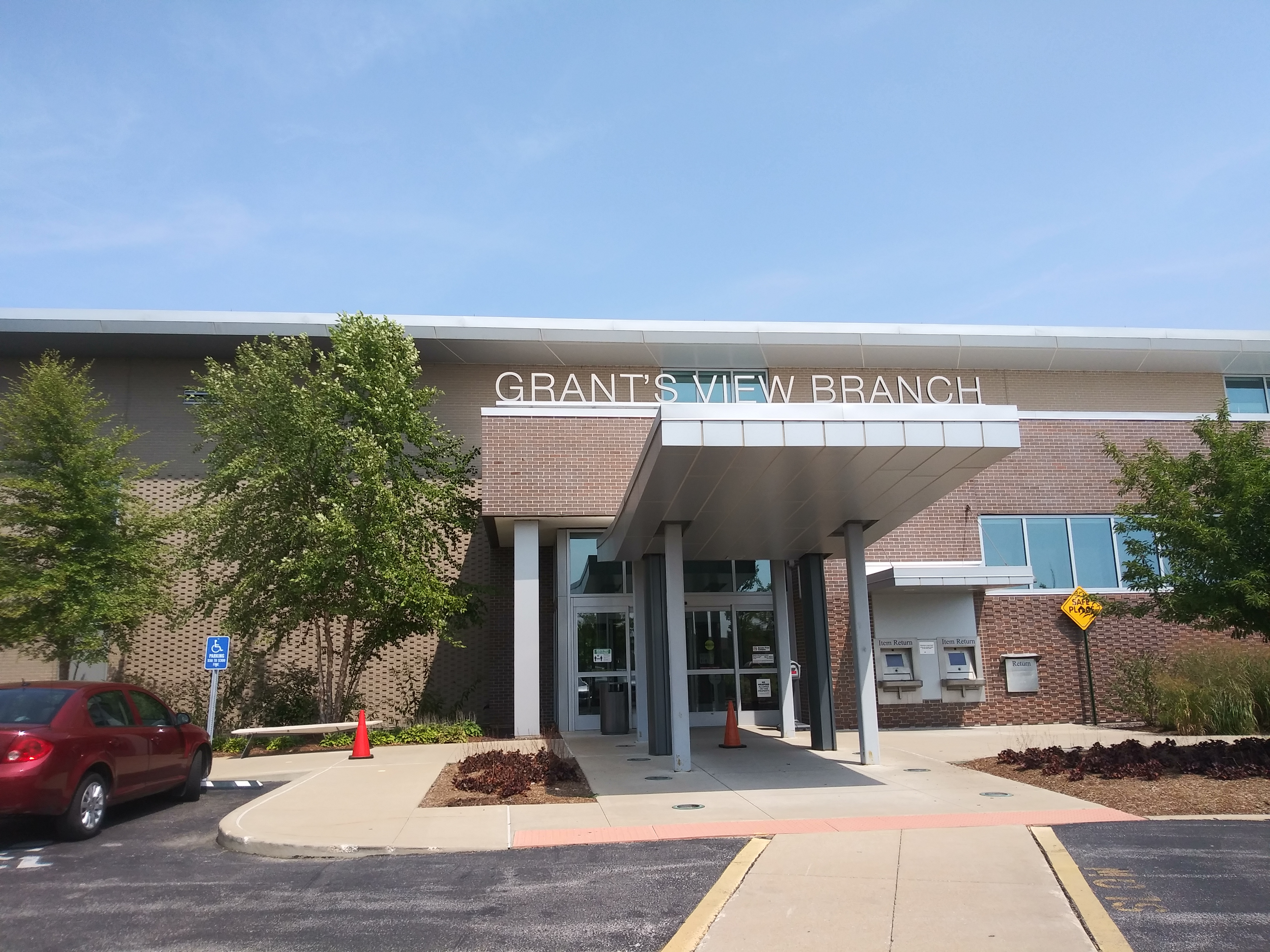
- The Grant's View Branch of the library, in August 2021
- 38°37′48″N 90°24′18″W
- Location: St. Louis County, Missouri
- Established: 1946
- Branches: 20

Collection
- Size: 1,667,721 (2023)

Access and use
- Circulation: 11,023,266 (2023)
- Population served: 859,639 (2023)

Other information
- Budget: $60 mil. (2020)
- Director: Kristen Sorth
- Website: slcl.org

St. Louis County Library (SLCL) is a library system that serves residents of St. Louis County, Missouri, United States. It is the busiest public library in Missouri, circulating more than 11 million items in 2023. It consists of 20 branches, including the Headquarters branch, which is located at 1640 S. Lindbergh Blvd in Ladue, Missouri.

St. Louis County Library is supported by the St. Louis County Library District, which includes most of St. Louis County. SLCL has reciprocal borrowing agreements with most of the other libraries in St. Louis County, as well as with the St. Louis Public Library and the St. Charles City-County Library. In 2018 the library joined the MOBIUS and Prospector loan systems.

The St. Louis County Library District is governed by a Board of Trustees, consisting of five members appointed by the County Council based on a recommendation of the County Executive. The Board of trustees is responsible for selecting and appointing a Library Director. The Director is the chief executive officer of the Library and is responsible for the execution of the orders and policies adopted by the Board. Information concerning the establishment and governance of the Library District can be found in Chapter 182 of the Missouri State Statutes.

== History ==
The St. Louis County Library District was established as a political subdivision of the State of Missouri with taxing authority by an election held in April 1946. The first library building opened in 1947 and was quickly followed by two branch locations. The 1960s saw an additional four branches, including a new headquarters building and the first of many building expansions. This building boom resulted in the construction of branches throughout the 523 square miles of the county. A tax levy passed in 1973 allowed the library to add 12 branches to the system, bringing the total number of branch locations to 20.

In 2020, St. Louis County Library announced that it will no longer charge fines on late materials. Patrons will still be required to pay for lost or damaged materials. In 2021, it was announced that St. Louis County Library and St. Louis City Library will begin sharing an Integrated Library System the following year. The integrated system will make it possible for patrons of both libraries to check out or view materials from either library. Patrons will not require a new library card.

A six-cent library district property tax increase was approved in 2012, which allowed St. Louis County Library to renovate and update 19 of its 20 locations as part of the decade-long “Your Library Renewed” campaign. Six branches were built, and thirteen were expanded or renovated. The largest branch to date is the Clark Family Branch, which replaces the old headquarters building. The campaign’s purpose was to update the branches to be modern libraries, with technology and space for modern patrons, including comfortable sitting areas, vending machines, community rooms, dedicated space for children and teens, and more technology like computers. “Your Library Renewed” concluded in July 2024 with the opening of the Clark Family branch.

== Collections and services ==
Items available to borrow include books, DVDs, CDs, audiobooks, video games, binoculars, laptops (along with WiFi hotspots), fishing equipment, musical instruments, projectors, and telescopes. Patrons also have access to various online resources, downloadable eBooks, audiobooks, magazines, and some web streaming content (movies and TV).

The loan period for all materials is 21 days, except for MOBIUS Books (28 days), and MOBIUS Audiovisual (AV) equipment (10 days).

In addition to books and other library materials, SLCL offers free programs and services including computer classes, small business assistance, job help, storytimes, STEM programming, summer and winter reading clubs, individualized help, and more. Individual branches offer a variety of programs as well as public computers, meeting spaces, free public WiFi, fax services, printing, document, and book scanning.

St. Louis County Library is a part of MOBIUS—a partnership of libraries providing patrons with access to over 60 million items from academic, special, and public libraries. Patrons can request MOBIUS materials through the MOBIUS online catalog with delivery to their local branch in less than five days.

=== Borrowing limits ===
There a maximum number of each type of item a patron can have checked out at one time. The limits are:

- 100 books
- Combined total of 25 CDs (Music and Audiobooks) and Playaways
- 25 DVDs
- Combined total of 5 Fishing Kits, Musical Instruments, Telescopes, and Wi-Fi Hotspots
- 1 pair of Binoculars
- 2 video games
- 1 portable Projector
- 5 Inter-Library Loans (of any type)
- 10 materials checked out from MOBIUS

The total limit of materials (of any type) checked out at any one time is 100.

== History and genealogy department ==
Founded in 1998, History & Genealogy at St. Louis County library features a research collection of over 95,000 print volumes, 850 periodical titles, and over 40,000 microfilms. History & Genealogy's collection offers unique genealogical and historical sources emphasizing the St. Louis Metropolitan area, the state of Missouri, and states and foreign countries that fed migration into Missouri. History & Genealogy offers access to substantial holdings for Atlantic states, the Northwest Territory, the Louisiana Purchase, and sources for Canada, Germany, Switzerland, France, and the British Isles. At its core are the collections of the St. Louis County Library and the St. Louis Genealogical Society.

In 2002, History & Genealogy at St. Louis County Library became the official home of the National Genealogical Society Collection, which includes over 30,000 items available for circulation or by inter-library loan. Other collections have followed including the William C.E. and Bessie Becker Collection (German, Swiss, British Isles), the Lewis Bunker Rohrbach Collection (Atlantic States, British Isles, Swiss), the Joy A. Reisinger Collection (French Canadian, Northwest Territory), the Julius K. Hunter and Friends African American Collection, the Mary Berthold Reference Collection, and the St. Louis Jewish Genealogical Society Collection.

History & Genealogy's equipment includes microfilm reader-printers, over-head book scanner, photocopiers, wi-fi, and free access to genealogical and historical research databases. History & Genealogy publishes the monthly newsletter PastPorts in support of historical and genealogical research. History & Genealogy is located at the Headquarters Branch and is open seven days per week. Groups and tours are welcomed by appointment.

== Branches ==
Branch (Location)	Address
Clark Family Branch(Frontenac)	1640 S. Lindbergh Blvd.
Daniel Boone Branch (Ellisville)	300 Clarkson Rd.
Bridgeton Trails Branch (Bridgeton)	3455 McKelvey Rd.
Cliff Cave Branch (Unincorporated area, Oakville CDP)	5430 Telegraph Rd.
Eureka Hills Branch (Eureka)	500 Workman Rd.
Florissant Valley Branch (Florissant)	195 New Florissant Rd.
Grand Glaize Branch (Manchester)	1010 Meramec Station Rd.
Grant's View Branch	9700 Musick Road
Headquarters (Frontenac)	1640 S. Lindbergh Blvd.
Jamestown Bluffs Branch (Unincorporated area)	4153 N. Hwy 67
Lewis and Clark Branch (Moline Acres)	9909 Lewis-Clark Blvd.
Meramec Valley Branch (Fenton)	1501 San Simeon Way
Mid-County Branch (Clayton)	7821 Maryland Ave.
Natural Bridge Branch (Normandy)	7606 Natural Bridge Rd.
Oak Bend Branch (Oakland)	842 S. Holmes Ave.
Parkview Branch (Vinita Park)	8400 Delport Dr.
Prairie Commons Branch (Hazelwood)	915 Utz Ln.
Rock Road Branch (St. Ann)	10267 St. Charles Rock Rd.
Samuel C. Sachs Branch (Chesterfield)	16400 Burkhardt Pl.
Thornhill Branch (Unincorporated area)	12863 Willowyck Dr.
Weber Road Branch (Unincorporated area)	4444 Weber Rd.
