= Nerinx Hall High School =

Nerinx Hall

Location
- 530 East Lockwood Avenue; Webster Groves, Missouri 63119; United States; 38.5899°N 90.3414°W

Information
- Type: Private, All-Girls
- Religious affiliation: Catholic
- Established: 1924; 102 years ago
- Founder: Sisters of Loretto
- President: John Gabriel
- Principal: Molly Grumich
- Faculty: 57
- Grades: 9–12
- Colors: Green and white
- Athletics conference: GISL
- Nickname: Markers
- Rival: Ursuline Academy
- Accreditation: Cognia
- Newspaper: Hallways
- Yearbook: The Key
- Tuition: $16,150
- Website: nerinxhall.org

Nerinx Hall High School is a private Catholic girls high school in Webster Groves, Missouri, and is part of the Archdiocese of St. Louis.

== History ==
Nerinx Hall began with three pioneer women, Mary Rhodes, Ann Havern and Christina Stuart, who founded the Sisters of Loretto in 1812. The Nerinx Hall name is a tribute to Father Charles Nerinckx's work. As the country moved west, so did the Sisters of Loretto. From frontier Kentucky into the mid- and southwest United States, the Sisters continued their involvement in Catholic education. In 1924, Nerinx Hall began educating young women in the Lockwood family home in Webster Groves, Missouri, graduating its first class in May 1925.

Over the years the school has grown in enrollment and physical facilities. Nerinx added a gym in 1947 and moved into the current red brick building in 1954. In 1993, Nerinx Hall returned to Lockwood House where the school had been founded. This historic home now houses a classroom and the bookstore, as well as departmental and administrative offices. In 1996, a new physics lab, media center, three classrooms and an elevator were added. The chemistry lab was also updated, and the library was expanded and renovated. In 2002, Nerinx Hall realized plans to "go green", with a biology lab renovation that included a new greenhouse for plant experimentation. In 2007, the school completed its largest expansion since the construction of the current school building in 1954. The 375-seat Heagney Theatre and the Knaup Family Student Commons were added to the campus at this time. A two-story classroom addition also brought a new music classroom and art lab spaces. The athletic field was also expanded and an artificial turf surface was installed.

In 2012, Sr. Barbara Roche, SL announced her intention to retire after serving as the school's president for the past 26 years. The Board of Trustees named John Gabriel, principal of Ursuline Academy (New Orleans), as the school's first lay-president effective for the 2013-2014 school year.

== Purpose ==
Nerinx Hall is grounded in the belief that educated, empowered and caring young women are vital to today's world and the future. In the four years a girl spends at Nerinx there are three main priorities: a woman must know herself and her world, diversity enriches while trust empowers, and all people are called to action.

== Extracurriculars ==
Nerinx hosts a variety of extracurricular activities. Students are strongly encouraged to join clubs, teams, and participate in fine arts to enrich their interests and interact with peers and classmates. The 30 clubs focus on a variety of topics from academics to service to leadership. Nerinx, more commonly known in the athletic world as home of the Markers, offers thirteen sports for the young women to participate in: swimming, soccer, track & field, lacrosse, diving, softball, field hockey, volleyball, tennis, golf, cross country, basketball and racquetball. In the 2010-2011 school year the girls had many athletic achievements. The golf team received 7th place in state, the cross country team took 2nd at sectionals, the tennis doubles team qualified for state, cross country brought home 5th place at state, and the JV racquetball team won 1st place in the state tournament. In 2015 the cross country team took first in state.

== Heagney Theater ==
The Heagney Theater was completed in the summer of 2007 and is the largest expansion project the school has seen since 1954. This addition to the school has four classrooms, a new music room, and a new theater. The theater seats 372 people and has an orchestra pit, scene shop and dressing rooms. The addition also holds two art labs and the fine arts department office.

== Notable people ==
=== Alumni ===
- Lori Chalupny, member of the 2008 U.S. Women's Olympic Soccer Team
- Jenna Fischer, actress
- Mary Frann, actress
- Marsha Mason, actress
- Kathryn Jamboretz, news anchor
- Meghan King Edmonds, reality star
- Claire Kellett, local TV anchor for KMOV
- Colleen Quigley, middle-distance runner and 2016 Olympian in the 3000-meter steeplechase

=== Faculty ===
- Jacqueline Grennan Wexler, Sister of Loretto and university president
