= Sisters of St. Joseph of Carondelet =

Catholic religious institute founded 1877

- Abbreviation: CSJ
- Formation: 16 May 1877; 149 years ago
- Type: religious institute
- Headquarters: Carondelet, Missouri
- Leadership Team: Gail Trippett, CSJ; Patty Chang, CSJ; Laura Bufano, CSJ; Anne Davis, CSJ; Eileen McCann, CSJ
- Parent organization: US Federation of the Sisters of St. Joseph
- Website: csjcarondelet.org

The Sisters of St. Joseph of Carondelet (CSJ) are a Catholic congregation of women religious which traces its origins to the Sisters of St. Joseph founded in Le Puy-en-Velay, France, around 1650. The design of the congregation was based on the spirituality of the Society of Jesus. The Sisters of St. Joseph of Carondelet became a separate congregation of pontifical right on May 16, 1877.

== History ==
In 1834, the Most Rev. Joseph Rosati, Bishop of St. Louis asked Mother St. John Fontbonne, the superior of the Sisters of St. Joseph at Lyon, to send some sisters to America to undertake instruction of deaf-mute children. Felicite’ Duras, Countess de la Roche Jacquelin, offered to defray expenses. On 17 January 1836, the first six sisters set sail from Le Havre, France on the ship Natchez. After seven weeks at sea, they arrived in New Orleans March 5, where they were met by Bishop Rosati and Rev. John Timon, the later Bishop of Buffalo. Rosati had arranged for them to stay with the Ursuline Sisters in the city and met with them the next day. The sisters enjoyed the hospitality of the Ursulines for two weeks, learning much about life in the United States. The Ursulines told them to disguise their religious habit when going abroad and while traveling to St. Louis as there was anti-Catholic feeling among some residents.

Escorted by Bishop Rosati, the sisters boarded the steamer, the George Collier, traveled up the Mississippi and reached St. Louis on 25 March 1836. Through Holy Week the sisters resided with the Sisters of Charity, who had a hospital near the Cathedral. On April 7, three of the sisters, accompanied by Bishop Rosati, travelled by boat for Cahokia, Illinois, a former French colonial town, where they opened a school for French and Creole settlers at the request of a Vincentian missionary. On September 12, the remaining sisters settled in a log cabin in the village of Carondelet, about five miles south of the city of St. Louis. At the time the sisters arrived at St. Louis, this humble house was occupied by the Sisters of Charity, who cared for a few orphans there who were soon transferred to a new building. Many institutions have started from the origin of these sisters and continue their good works; St. Joseph Institute for the Deaf, St. Joseph's Academy, Fontbonne College, Fontbonne University (both now closed), all were founded by the sisters of the convent at Carondelet.

In 1847, the first foundation outside St. Louis was made in Philadelphia, Pennsylvania, followed shortly by foundations in Toronto, Ontario, Canada (1851); Hamilton, Ontario (1852); Wheeling, West Virginia (1853); and Canandaigua (1854); Flushing (Brentwood) (1856); Rochester; and Buffalo, all in New York state, which had received many Irish Catholic immigrants. In 1851, Bishop Joseph Cretin went to Carondelet to ask Mother Celestine to send the Sisters of St. Joseph to his new diocese in St. Paul, Minnesota; four sisters reached there by steamboat on 3 November. In 1853, Bishop John McCloskey of Albany, New York requested sisters for Cohoes, New York. On April 15, 1858, one German, one Irish, and two native-born sisters arrived by train in Oswego, New York in the midst of a snowstorm, to establish a school for Catholic immigrants. In 1869 the Flushing community sent three pioneer sisters to Ebensburg, Pennsylvania.

Because of the rapid growth of the institute and the increasing demand for sisters from all parts of the United States, the superiors of the community called a general chapter in May 1860, to which representatives from every congregational house in America were summoned. Mother St. John Facemaz was elected first superior general for a term of six years. Shortly afterward, she traveled to Rome to present a copy of the Constitution for Vatican approval. In September 1863, Pope Pius IX issued a degree of commendation. Final approbation was received, dated May 16, 1877. This approval established the Sisters of St. Joseph of Carondelet as a congregation of pontifical right, and unified their communities in various dioceses with the mother-house at Carondelet (now part of St. Louis, Missouri).

During the Civil War, the order sent nuns to serve as Army nurses. According to Civil War medical historian George Adams, Dorothea Dix, the head of Army nurses distrusted them; her anti-Catholicism undermined her ability to work with Catholic nurses, lay or religious. In 1910, the congregation divided into four provinces.

== Present day ==
The congregation is composed of almost 600 vowed sisters. The Congregational Center is located in Sunset Hills, Missouri, a suburb of St. Louis.

The congregation is led by a leadership team, which currently consists of sisters Gail Trippett, Patty Chang, Laura Bufano, Anne Davis and Eileen McCann.

=== St. Louis, Missouri Province ===
The St. Louis, Missouri Province comprises the houses of the congregation in the Archdioceses of St. Louis and Chicago, and the dioceses of St. Joseph, Kansas City, Indianapolis, Peoria, Belleville, Alton, Denver, Marquette, Green Bay, Mobile, and the Diocese of Oklahoma.

The Sisters of St. Joseph of Savannah were established at Savannah in 1867, in charge of the boys' orphanage, and soon afterward became an independent diocesan congregation. In 1876 the orphanage was transferred to Washington, Georgia, and with it the mother-house of the congregation. In 1912 the Sisters opened an academy for women in Augusta which became Mount Saint Joseph. They eventually moved the mother house to Augusta, Georgia. In 1922 the Sisters voted to incorporate themselves into the Sisters of Saint Joseph of Carondelet, becoming the Augusta Province and became part of the St. Louis Province in 1961.

In St. Louis, Missouri the Sisters of St. Joseph of Carondelet St. Louis sponsor Saint Joseph Institute for the Deaf, Saint Joseph's Academy, Fontbonne University (now closed), and Ascension Health; and in Kansas City, Missouri, they sponsor St. Teresa's Academy and Avila University.

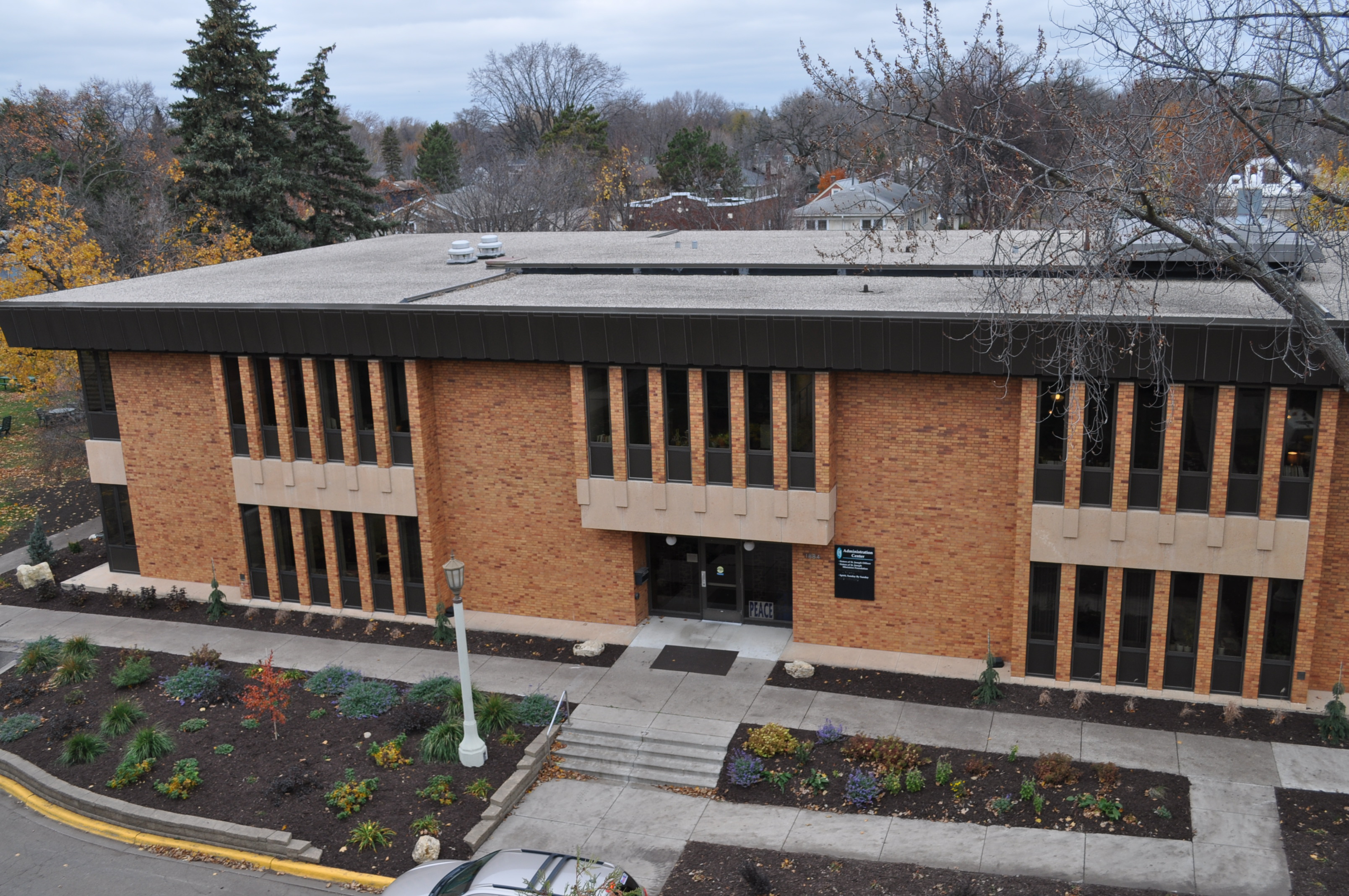
Administration Center of the Sisters of St. Joseph of Carondelet & Consociates, St. Paul Province

=== St. Paul Province ===
In 1851, four Sisters arrived in the village of St. Paul, Minnesota, to establish the Sisters of St. Joseph of Carondelet, St. Paul Province. A log cabin became the first site of Saint Joseph's Academy in early November 1851, a day and boarding school for girls. In 1853, in response to the cholera epidemic, the sisters turned the school into the first site of St. Joseph's Hospital, which was also the state of Minnesota's first hospital.

The growth of the St. Paul community began with the entrance of its first postulants, Ellen Ireland and her cousin Ellen Howard, in the summer of 1858. By then the pattern of response to need had been firmly set with the opening of St. Joseph Academy in St. Paul, Long Prairie Indian Mission, St. Anthony's School in Minneapolis, and St. Joseph Hospital and Cathedral School in St. Paul. Orphans were taken care of in all these institutions.

In 1905, the St. Paul Province founded the College of St. Catherine (now St. Catherine University) in St. Paul, Minnesota. The Province continues to sponsor and support the university.

In 2016, the St. Paul Province celebrated its 175th year. Its ministries range from young adult spirituality to immigrant and refugee services. Through these ministries, St. Paul Sisters and Consociates strive to foster the common good through advocacy, creative arts, education, healthcare, social service, and spirituality.

=== Albany Province ===
Four young sisters arrived at the parish of St. Mary's in Oswego, New York on April 15, 1858. Soon more sisters joined them and a day school was established, as well as an academy and a home for orphans. The Albany Province (formerly Troy, New York) is formed of the houses established in the Dioceses of Albany and Syracuse, New York. The Albany Province of the Sisters of St. Joseph of Carondelet founded and sponsor the College of St. Rose (now closed), Albany, New York, named in honor of St. Rose of Lima, the first canonized saint in the Americas. The Provincial House is in Latham, New York. It is a home both to current sisters as well as retired nuns and those with long-term healthcare needs. During the coronavirus pandemic of 2020, the Albany Province lost nine nuns and saw nearly half of the nuns infected with the virus.

=== Los Angeles Province ===
Los Angeles is the youngest of the four provinces of the Congregation of St. Joseph of Carondelet. Santa Fe bishop Jean-Baptiste Lamy, and the newly installed bishop of Tucson, Jean-Baptiste Salpointe, wrote to Carondelet in the late 1860s asking for sisters to establish a school in Tucson, Arizona. Seven Sisters began the long journey to the west in April 1870, traveling on the newly completed transcontinental railroad to San Francisco, by steamer to San Diego, and by covered wagon across the American Desert to Tucson, Arizona. Their first school, the future St. Joseph's Academy, opened on June 6, 1870, eleven days after their arrival in Tucson.

Ministries spread rapidly from this early beginning with schools opening in Arizona and California. By 1873, the Sisters had opened a school for the Papago Indians at San Xavier del Bac. Within a few years, they were ministering at Fort Yuma, St. Anthony's in San Diego, St. Boniface School in Banning, and St. John's Mission School in Komatke. When Bishop Salpointe opened St. Mary's Hospital in Tucson in 1880, health care became an important part of the Sisters’ ministry. Over the years, the Sisters sponsored and operated hospitals in Arizona, California, Washington, and Idaho until recent developments in health care led them to transfer ownership and sponsorship to a Catholic health system.

As the majority of ministries increased in California, Los Angeles was selected as seat of the western province and established in 1903. Academies were established as early as 1882, Mount St. Mary's College (now University) was founded in 1925, and Sisters were teaching in parish schools in five states. Work with the deaf, a treasured tradition since the first days in St. Louis, flourished for many years in Oakland and San Francisco. In 1925, the Sisters of St. Joseph of Lewiston, Idaho, joined the Carondelet congregation. In 2011, the Sisters of the Vice Province of Japan joined the Los Angeles Province as a region.

From the first days in Arizona, education and health care merged naturally into other forms of care of the dear neighbor. Over the years, and especially after Vatican II, the Sisters’ work has expanded and diversified, including parish service, adult education, spiritual direction and retreat work, direct service of the poor, and justice activities. In July 2017, the Hawaii Vice Province, erected in 1956, officially joined the Los Angeles Province.

==== Sponsored institutions ====
Academy of Our Lady of Peace, San Diego; Carondelet High School, Concord, CA; St. Joseph High School, Lakewood, CA (philosophical sponsorship); St. Joseph Joshi Gakuen, Tsu, Japan; St. Mary's Academy, Inglewood, CA; Mount Saint Mary's University, Los Angeles; St. Joseph Center, Venice, CA; St. Catherine University, St. Paul, MN;Rosati-Kain Academy, St. Louis, MO.

==== Selected province works ====
A Friendly Manor, Alexandria House, Circle the city, Get on the Bus, House of Yahweh, Villa Maria House of Prayer.

=== Peru Vice-Province ===
In 1962, the Sisters of St. Joseph responded to the request of Pope John XXIII that religious communities send ten percent of their members as missionaries to Latin America.

== Governance ==
The superior general and four general councillors, elected every six years by the whole congregation, form the Congregational Leadership Team.

The term of postulantship extends from three to six months, the term of novitiate two years, after which annual vows are taken for a period of five years, when perpetual vows are taken. All are received on the same footing, all enjoy the same privileges, and all are subject to the same obedience which assigns duties according to ability, talent, and aptitude.
