= Ursuline Academy (Missouri) =

Catholic school in Missouri, United States

Location
- 341 S Sappington Road; Oakland, Missouri 63122; United States; 38°34′39″N 90°23′17″W

Information
- Type: Private, All-Girls
- Motto: Latin: Serviam (I will serve)
- Religious affiliation: Roman Catholic (Ursulines)
- Patron saints: St. Angela Merici and St. Ursula
- Established: November 2, 1848; 177 years ago
- President: Peggy Slater
- Principal: Mark Michalski
- Grades: 9–12
- Enrollment: 385
- Student to teacher ratio: 8.4:1
- Campus size: 28 acres (110,000 m^{2})
- Colors: Red and white
- Slogan: Discover the Power Within U
- Athletics conference: GISL
- Mascot: Ursa Bear
- Nickname: Bears
- Rival: Nerinx Hall High School
- Accreditation: Cognia
- Newspaper: Bear Facts
- Tuition: $19,950
- Website: ursulinestl.org

Ursuline Academy (UA) is a private, all-girls Catholic high school in Oakland, Missouri. It is located in the Archdiocese of St. Louis and was founded in 1848.

== History ==
Ursuline Academy was opened on November 2, 1848, by three Ursuline Sisters from Austria-Hungary and a woman from Bavaria who had been preparing to become an Ursuline Sister.

On October 21, 2025, sponsorship of Ursuline was transferred from the Ursuline Sisters of the Roman Union, Central Province to the newly founded Ursuline Education Foundation.

== Campus ==
In 2017, Ursuline opened Hartnett Hall, an academic building with four science labs, a dance studio, and a music studio. It was named after Thelma Hartnett, a UA employee of 55 years.

== Athletics and activities ==
Ursuline's athletic teams are known as the Bears, and they compete in sports sponsored by the Missouri State High School Activities Association. Ursuline is a member of the Girls Independent Schools League, a high school athletic conference in the St. Louis area. In 2021, the soccer team won the Class 2 state championship.

Ursuline also competes in the Missouri Dance Team Association, where its teams have won state championships in 2018, 2025, and 2026.

== Notable alumnae ==
- Nicole Galloway (b. 1982): politician, state auditor of Missouri
- Lillian Gish (1893–1993): stage and film actress
- Rosejoan Holden ('41), creator of the original recipe of Chex Mix
- Laura Sawyer (1885–1970): silent film actress
- Bridget Walsh Moore (b. 1988): politician, Missouri State House of Representatives
