= Walter Bargen =

Poet Laureate of Missouri

Walter Bargen (born c. 1945) is an American poet, the first Poet Laureate of Missouri, a position which he held from February 13, 2008 to January 2010.

== Biography ==
Born to an American father and a German mother, Bargen's childhood was spent traveling back and forth between Germany and the United States. In the early 1950s, he lived and played in the ruins of Mannheim-Heidelberg. In the 1960s, he settled in Missouri, working as a construction foreman, writing poetry on the side as a way of exploring the confusion caused by World War II. He wrote his first poem in high school, and has since been published in approximately one hundred magazines. His first book was published in 1980, Fields of Thenar. In the 1990s, he wrote several works about Missouri, such as one volume which focused on the Missouri River.

== Awards ==
- 1991, National Endowment for the Arts poetry fellowship
- 1996, Quarter after Eight Prose Prize
- 1996, Hanks Prize
- 1997, Chester H. Jones Foundation poetry prize
