= Oakland, Missouri =

- City
- Location of Oakland, Missouri
- Coordinates: 38°34′37″N 90°23′06″W
- Country: United States
- State: Missouri
- County: St. Louis

Area
  - Total: 0.60 sq mi (1.56 km^{2})
  - Land: 0.60 sq mi (1.56 km^{2})
  - Water: 0 sq mi (0.00 km^{2})
- Elevation: 610 ft (190 m)

Population (2020)
  - Total: 1,390
  - Density: 2,306/sq mi (890.4/km^{2})
- Time zone: UTC-6 (Central (CST))
  - Summer (DST): UTC-5 (CDT)
- ZIP code: 63122
- Area code: 314
- FIPS code: 29-53750
- GNIS feature ID: 2395290
- Website: www.oaklandmo.org

Oakland is a city in St. Louis County, Missouri, United States. As of the 2020 census, Oakland had a population of 1,390.

== Geography ==
According to the United States Census Bureau, the city has a total area of 0.61 square miles (1.58 km^{2}), all land.

== Demographics ==
Historical population
Census	Pop.	Note	%±
1930	557		—
1940	789		41.7%
1960	1,552		—
1970	1,609		3.7%
1980	1,728		7.4%
1990	1,593		−7.8%
2000	1,540		−3.3%
2010	1,381		−10.3%
2020	1,390		0.7%
U.S. Decennial Census

=== 2020 census ===
Oakland city, Missouri – Racial and ethnic composition Note: the US Census treats Hispanic/Latino as an ethnic category. This table excludes Latinos from the racial categories and assigns them to a separate category. Hispanics/Latinos may be of any race.
Race / Ethnicity (NH = Non-Hispanic)	Pop 2000	Pop 2010	Pop 2020	% 2000	% 2010	% 2020
White alone (NH)	1,490	1,318	1,268	96.75%	95.44%	91.22%
Black or African American alone (NH)	26	27	39	1.69%	1.96%	2.81%
Native American or Alaska Native alone (NH)	0	1	4	0.00%	0.07%	0.29%
Asian alone (NH)	8	6	17	0.52%	0.43%	1.22%
Native Hawaiian or Pacific Islander alone (NH)	0	0	0	0.00%	0.00%	0.00%
Other race alone (NH)	2	0	5	0.13%	0.00%	0.36%
Mixed race or Multiracial (NH)	4	576	32	0.26%	41.71%	2.30%
Hispanic or Latino (any race)	10	14	25	0.65%	1.01%	1.80%
Total	1,540	1,942	1,390	100.00%	100.00%	100.00%

=== 2010 census ===
As of the census of 2010, there were 1,381 people, 452 households, and 324 families living in the city. The population density was 2,263.9 inhabitants per square mile (874.1/km^{2}). There were 494 housing units at an average density of 809.8 per square mile (312.7/km^{2}). The racial makeup of the city was 96.2% White, 2.2% African American, 0.1% Native American, 0.4% Asian, and 1.1% from two or more races. Hispanic or Latino of any race were 1.0% of the population.

There were 452 households, of which 32.3% had children under the age of 18 living with them, 61.1% were married couples living together, 8.8% had a female householder with no husband present, 1.8% had a male householder with no wife present, and 28.3% were non-families. 24.3% of all households were made up of individuals, and 11.5% had someone living alone who was 65 years of age or older. The average household size was 2.43 and the average family size was 2.90.

The median age in the city was 52.7 years. 18.2% of residents were under the age of 18; 3.5% were between the ages of 18 and 24; 18.7% were from 25 to 44; 27.7% were from 45 to 64; and 32.1% were 65 years of age or older. The gender makeup of the city was 40.0% male and 60.0% female.

=== 2000 census ===
As of the census of 2000, there were 1,540 people, 448 households, and 340 families living in the city. The population density was 2,545.7 inhabitants per square mile (982.9/km^{2}). There were 459 housing units at an average density of 758.7 per square mile (292.9/km^{2}). The racial makeup of the city was 97.34% White, 1.69% African American, 0.52% Asian, 0.19% from other races, and 0.26% from two or more races. Hispanic or Latino of any race were 0.65% of the population.

There were 448 households, out of which 33.3% had children under the age of 18 living with them, 66.5% were married couples living together, 8.0% had a female householder with no husband present, and 23.9% were non-families. 21.4% of all households were made up of individuals, and 9.2% had someone living alone who was 65 years of age or older. The average household size was 2.48 and the average family size was 2.87.

In the city, the population was spread out, with 16.8% under the age of 18, 3.1% from 18 to 24, 20.7% from 25 to 44, 20.9% from 45 to 64, and 38.5% who were 65 years of age or older. The median age was 52 years. For every 100 females, there were 67.2 males. For every 100 females age 18 and over, there were 59.1 males.

The median income for a household in the city was $65,000, and the median income for a family was $71,250. Males had a median income of $60,063 versus $37,132 for females. The per capita income for the city was $27,583. About 2.3% of families and 3.1% of the population were below the poverty line, including 3.5% of those under age 18 and 5.2% of those age 65 or over.

== Education ==
The all-girls Roman Catholic High School Ursuline Academy is located in the city of Oakland. St. Louis County Library operates the Oak Bend Branch in Oakland.
