= Fontbonne University =

Private university in Clayton, Missouri, U.S.

- Former names: St. Joseph's Academy (1841–1923) (separated from college in 1955); Fontbonne College (1923–2002)
- Motto: Virtus et Scienta (Latin)
- Motto in English: Virtue and Knowledge
- Type: Private university
- Active: 1841; 185 years ago (predecessor); 1923–2025 (college)
- Accreditation: HLC
- Religious affiliation: Catholic (Sisters of St. Joseph of Carondelet)
- Academic affiliations: ACCU; CIC
- Location: Clayton, Missouri; St. Louis, Missouri postal address, United States; 38.6423°N 90.3157°W
- Campus: Urban
- Colors: Purple, blue, gold, white
- Nickname: Griffins
- Mascot: Griffin
- Website: fontbonne.edu
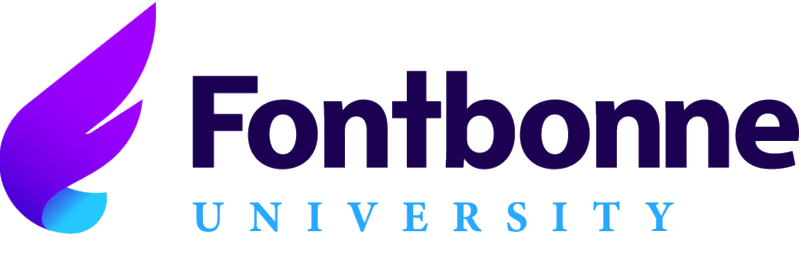

Fontbonne University was a private Catholic university in Clayton, Missouri, United States. Fontbonne University, established in 1923 as Fontbonne College, initially served as a women's college. Fontbonne College became co-educational in the 1970s. Its athletic teams competed in the St. Louis Intercollegiate Athletic Conference. In 2023, there were 874 students enrolled.

In March 2024, university officials made public their decision to cease operations by 2025. Washington University in St. Louis agreed to purchase the campus.

== History ==
=== Early history ===
Fontbonne University, established in 1923 as "Fontbonne College" as a women's college, takes its name from Mother St. John Fontbonne, who, in 1808 after the French Revolution, refounded the Congregation of the Sisters of St. Joseph (CSJ). More than a century and a half before, in 1650, the Sisters of St. Joseph had been founded in LePuy, France. During the French Revolution, the sisters were forced to return to their homes and the community was dispersed. Some 28 years after the re-founding, six Sisters of St. Joseph came to the United States in 1836 and established American roots at Carondelet, a small community in south St. Louis, Missouri within the Archdiocese of St. Louis. Five years later, in 1841, they opened St. Joseph's Academy for girls.

First classes began at "Carondelet College" following World War I, with the first eight baccalaureate degrees given in 1927. By then, a new campus at the current location was built to accommodate the increase in students. Over the next 20 years a liberal arts curriculum was developed. A cafeteria, swimming pool, and gymnasium were added to the original buildings (Ryan Hall, Science Building, Fine Arts Building). Medaille Hall, the university's first residence hall, was dedicated. The school, received North Central accreditation and degree-granting powers.

In the 1950s its Department of Education was expanded to include special education, behavioral disorders, learning disabilities, and mental handicaps. A major in deaf education linked Fontbonne with St. Joseph's Institute for the Deaf. The department of communication disorders was established to prepare teachers for speech-impaired children and adults. Insufficient space led to the high school and college sections to be separated and the former moved to its new campus in the suburb of Frontenac in 1955. The college section became Fontbonne College as the academy name solely referred to the high school.

On October 24, 1970, a group of eight African American women entered the library of Fontbonne University with a common goal. Yolande Nicholson, Antoinette Smith, Rita Hunt, Jeannette Gauda, Collette Lemelle and three others chained the doors of the library shut and began to do their homework as they occupied the space. Their goal was to see the points in their previously written manifesto come to reality. In their manifesto they asked the following changes to be made at Fontbonne: to have an African American administrator, an African American officer in both Financial Aid and Admissions, an African American counselor, an orientation program more geared towards African Americans, African American cultural education experiences, a specific area in the library for African American students and an establishment of an African American artist series fund. Along with these demands, their manifesto demanded wage increases and an improvement of working conditions for African American workers at Fontbonne. Overall, the demands of these women were an effort to more fully integrate African American students and workers with the Fontbonne Community, and to address their concerns about exclusion.

=== Recent history ===
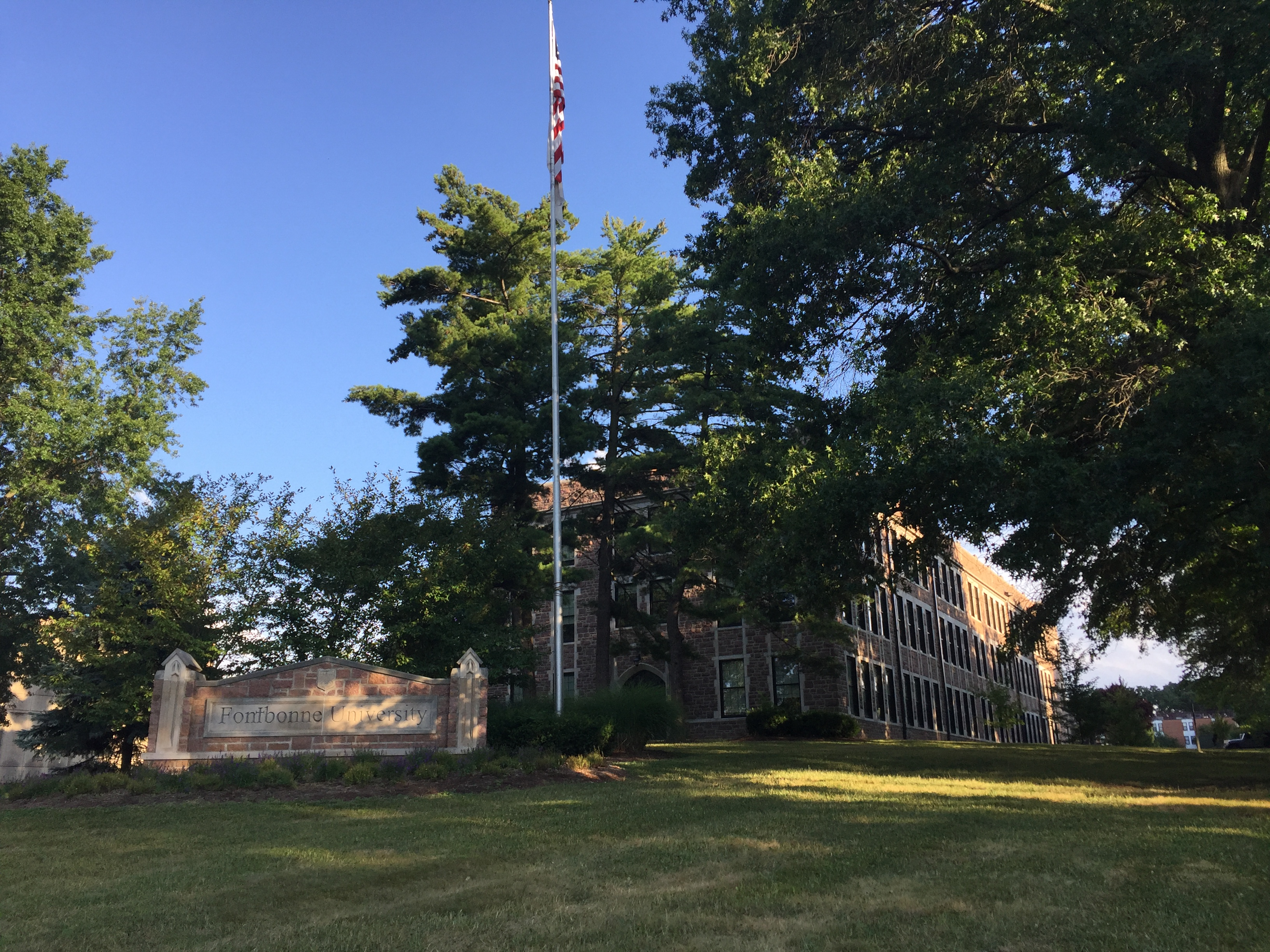
Fontbonne University in 2017

Fontbonne College became co-educational in the 1970s. Service programs were expanded to areas such as dietetics, special education, communication disorders and deaf education. A predominantly lay board of trustees was formed. The Fontbonne Library was dedicated, along with two more residence halls.

The first male president, Dr. Dennis C. Golden, was inaugurated in September 1995. The school celebrated its 75th anniversary during the 1998–99 academic year. March 14, 2002 marked the change in status from Fontbonne College to Fontbonne University. On February 1, 2014, J. Michael (Mike) Pressimone, Ed.D., was selected the 14th president of Fontbonne University. He assumed office on July 1, 2014.

In 2017, Fontbonne purchased 23 acres (9.3 ha) of the former JFK High School in western St. Louis County to allow its student-athletes to train and play home games. The new space was to also allow the college to offer adult and continuing education courses. In 2020, it put up the former JFK high school for sale to concentrate on its main campus instead.

Nancy Blattner became the university's 15th president in 2020. She was previously the president of Caldwell University, and was Fontbonne's vice president of academic affairs from 2004 to 2009.

In 2022, it was revealed that the huge drop in enrollment of students from 2,293 (in 2011) to 955 (in 2021) had caused the university to operate at a deficit for the previous 10 years.

By November, 2023 enrollment had dropped to 874 with a deficit of $5.2 million.

In March 2024, officials with the university announced that it will close in 2025. The adjacent Washington University in St. Louis has agreed to purchase the campus. After the closure, Fontbonne student records are maintained by Saint Louis University.

== Athletics ==
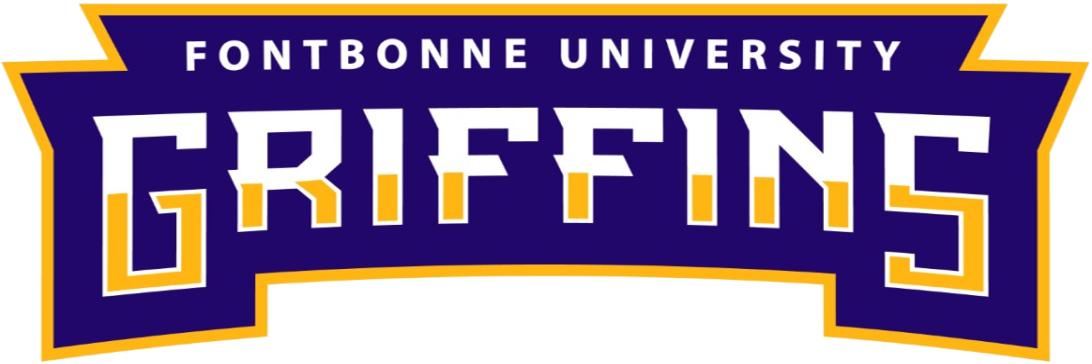
Fontbonne athletics wordmark

The Fontbonne athletic teams were called the Griffins. The university was a member of the Division III ranks of the National Collegiate Athletic Association (NCAA), primarily competing in the St. Louis Intercollegiate Athletic Conference (SLIAC) since it was a founding member back in the 1989–90 academic year. The Griffins also previously competed in the Show–Me Conference (now currently known as the American Midwest Conference since 1994–95) of the National Association of Intercollegiate Athletics (NAIA) from 1986–87 to 1989–90 (the latter school year was due to dual membership within the NAIA and the NCAA Division III ranks).

Fontbonne competed in 23 intercollegiate varsity sports. Men's sports included baseball, basketball, cross country, golf, soccer, sprint football (beginning in 2022), track & field (indoor and outdoor), volleyball and wrestling, while women's sports include basketball, cross country, golf, soccer, softball, stunt (formerly co-ed), track & field (indoor and outdoor), volleyball and wrestling, and co-ed sports include cheerleading, dance and eSports. None of the co-ed sports are recognized or governed by the NCAA.

In 2022, Fontbonne became one of six charter members of the Midwest Sprint Football League.

== Notable alumni ==
- Bob Cassilly (1949–2011) - sculptor and founder of the City Museum
- Sam Dotson (born 1969) - police commissioner
- Karla Drenner (born 1961) - politician
- La'Roi Glover (born 1974) - football player and coach
- Ken Page (1954–2024) - actor and singer
- Mary Louise Preis (born 1941) - politician
- Nate Tate (born 1979) - politician
