= Jack Lorenz =

American climate activities

John R. Lorenz (March 14, 1939 – March 2, 2009) was an American environmental activist who led the Izaak Walton League. He served the League for nearly two decades. Lorenz was a vocal advocate for ethical use of outdoor spaces and lobbied off-road vehicle manufacturers to avoid advertisements depicting and glorifying irresponsible treatment of forests and streams. An avid fisherman, Lorenz fished in all 50 states and all of Canada's provinces.

== Life and work ==
Lorenz was born in St. Louis, Missouri, on March 14, 1939, and grew up in suburban Webster Groves. He attended the University of Tulsa, graduating in 1961, went on to work for the Falstaff Brewing Corporation in St. Louis, and became the leader of the Izaak Walton League in 1974.

While serving as Executive Director of the Izaak Walton League, Lorenz implemented a number of noted programs. In addition to starting the Outdoor Ethics program, he initiated the League's "Save Our Streams" initiative, a program to encourage public support for efforts by local groups to clean up waterways and lakes. He championed "catch and release" practices at fishing tournaments, practices that have become almost universally implemented. He helped to establish the Jackson Hole Land Trust, which provides assistance to landowners in Wyoming who want to dedicate their wild lands for preservation. Lorenz co-founded a number of groups that have carried on the initiatives he and others in the environmental movement advocated, including the Wildlife Habitat Council, the Green Group, and the Washington Conservation Roundtable. He also served as President of the American League of Anglers and Boaters.

Lorenz's work on behalf of fishing and hunting advocates as well as environmentalists and conservationists brought him acclaim in both communities, capitalizing on their mutual interests to advance programs that served both communities.

Lorenz was honored for his work by awards from most major environmental organizations and many smaller ones. His own Izaak Walton League placed him in its Hall of Fame, and honored him with their 54 Founders Award, the highest honor offered by the League. He received the coveted "Jade of Chiefs" award from the Outdoor Writers Association of America, the Chevron Times Mirror Conservation Award, and the Award of Honor from the Natural Resources Council of America, among others.

Lorenz's tenure with the Izaak Walton League was cut short by ill health. He suffered from cardiovascular disease and had several major strokes that affected his speech, vision and mobility. He had numerous heart surgeries, as well, and suffered epileptic seizures periodically throughout his life. However, he continued to be active in the conservation movement long after leaving the League and until his death. He served on the Chevron Texaco Conservation Awards committee, helping to select recipients who were continuing the work he loved so well. He was active with many smaller groups, including Friends of the North Fork of the Shenandoah River, on whose board he served, an organization of activists dedicated to protecting their river from environmental degradation.

Lorenz's work reflected a keen sense of altruism and practicality, a desire to leave something behind him that would demonstrate to future generations the important role the wild places of the country played in his life. He had grown up fishing the rivers in Missouri and Arkansas with his father, and he wanted others to have that same kind of experience. He is quoted as often saying that the hard work and sacrifice of his job was worth it. "The gratitude of our children will be thanks enough for our work."

Lorenz, who lived in Woodstock, Virginia, died of a stroke on March 2, 2009, in San Diego, California.
