= Webster Groves, Missouri =

City in Missouri, United States

- City
- Webster Groves in October 2026

- Location of Webster Groves, Missouri
- Coordinates: 38°35′12″N 90°21′16″W
- Country: United States
- State: Missouri
- County: St. Louis

Government
  - Mayor: Laura Arnold

Area
  - Total: 5.91 sq mi (15.31 km^{2})
  - Land: 5.91 sq mi (15.31 km^{2})
  - Water: 0 sq mi (0.00 km^{2})
- Elevation: 564 ft (172 m)

Population (2020)
  - Total: 24,010
  - Density: 4,060.5/sq mi (1,567.77/km^{2})
- Time zone: UTC−6 (Central (CST))
  - Summer (DST): UTC−5 (CDT)
- ZIP Code: 63119
- Area code: 314
- FIPS code: 29-78154
- GNIS feature ID: 2397242
- Website: www.webstergrovesmo.gov

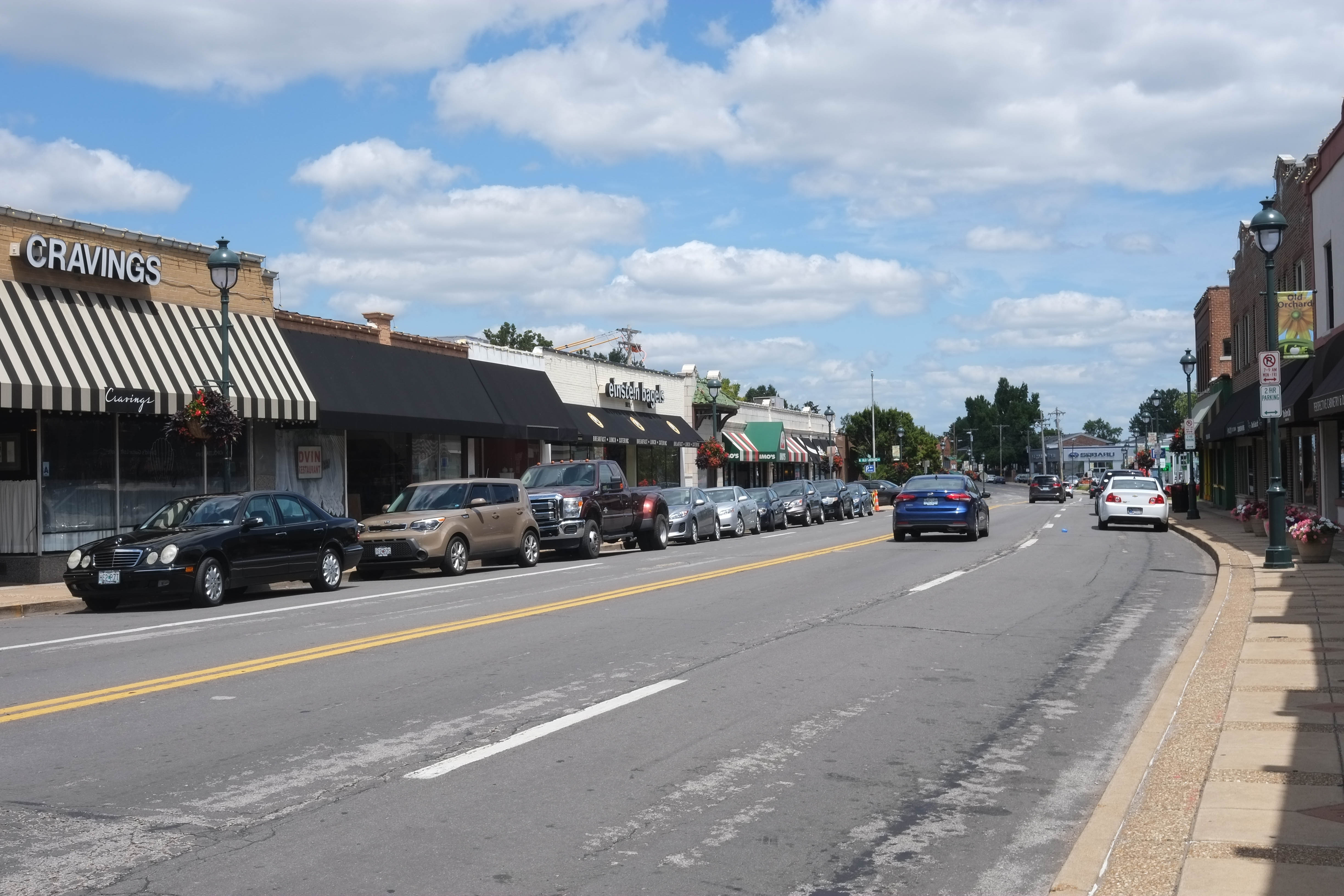
Big Bend Boulevard in Webster Groves, August 2017

Webster Groves is an inner-ring suburb of St. Louis in St. Louis County, Missouri, United States. The population was 24,010 at the 2020 census. The city is home to the main campus of Webster University.

== Geography ==
According to the United States Census Bureau, the city has a total area of 5.90 square miles (15.28 km^{2}), all land.

Webster Groves is bounded to the east by Shrewsbury, on the north by Maplewood, Brentwood and Rock Hill, to the west by Glendale, Oakland, and Crestwood, and on the south by Affton and Marlborough.

== History ==
Webster Groves is approximately 2 miles (3 km) west of the St. Louis city limits, and 10 miles (16 km) southwest of downtown St. Louis, in an area known to fur trappers and Missouri, Osage and Dakota indigenous people, until 1802, as the Dry Ridge. In the early 19th century, this region, once a part of the Louisiana Territory, was changing from Spanish to French ownership, and a system of land grants was inaugurated to promote immigration. During the early period of Spanish rule, officials gave land to settlers as a check against the English.

As part of this program, in 1802, Grégoire Sarpy was granted 6,002 acres (2,429 ha) by Charles de Hault Delassus, the last Spanish lieutenant governor of the Illinois Country. The land grant covered the major area now known as Webster Groves.

Webster Groves' location on the Pacific Railroad line led to its development as a suburb. In 1892 the developers of Webster Park, an early housing subdivision, promoted the new community as the "Queen of the Suburbs", offering residents superb housing options in a country-like atmosphere, as well as a swift commute to downtown St. Louis jobs. The first public school in the community was Douglass Elementary School, founded as a separate but equal school for African-American children in the post-Civil War black community in North Webster. In the 1920s, the school grew into Douglass High School, the only high school in St. Louis County for black students. The school operated until 1956, when the U.S. Supreme Court required desegregation.

As a suburban municipality, Webster Groves has its origins as five separate communities along adjacent railroad lines. Webster, Old Orchard, Webster Park, Tuxedo Park, and Selma merged in 1896 to implement public services and develop a unified city government. Since then, Webster Groves' tree-lined streets and abundance of single family homes have continued to attract people to the area as a "great place to live, work and play", not solely for the wealthy commuter suburb that early developers envisioned but for families that cut across all socioeconomic lines. The geographic and economic diversity of Webster Groves is evident in its variety of neighborhoods.

Webster Groves was the setting for the 1974–75 NBC television series Lucas Tanner.

In October 2026, Webster Groves and Great Rivers Greenway built Oxford Bend Park near Big Bend Blvd, Shrewsbury, Maplewood and Deer Creek. The site was occupied by a former McDonald's restaurant and its parking lot. Webster Groves have partnered with Great Rivers Greenway within the redevelopment project which is established. The project was planned for 2024, and construction began in 2025. It includes walking paths, bike repairs, natures, trees, drinking fountains, skateable features, and benching, solar-powered lighting.

== Government ==
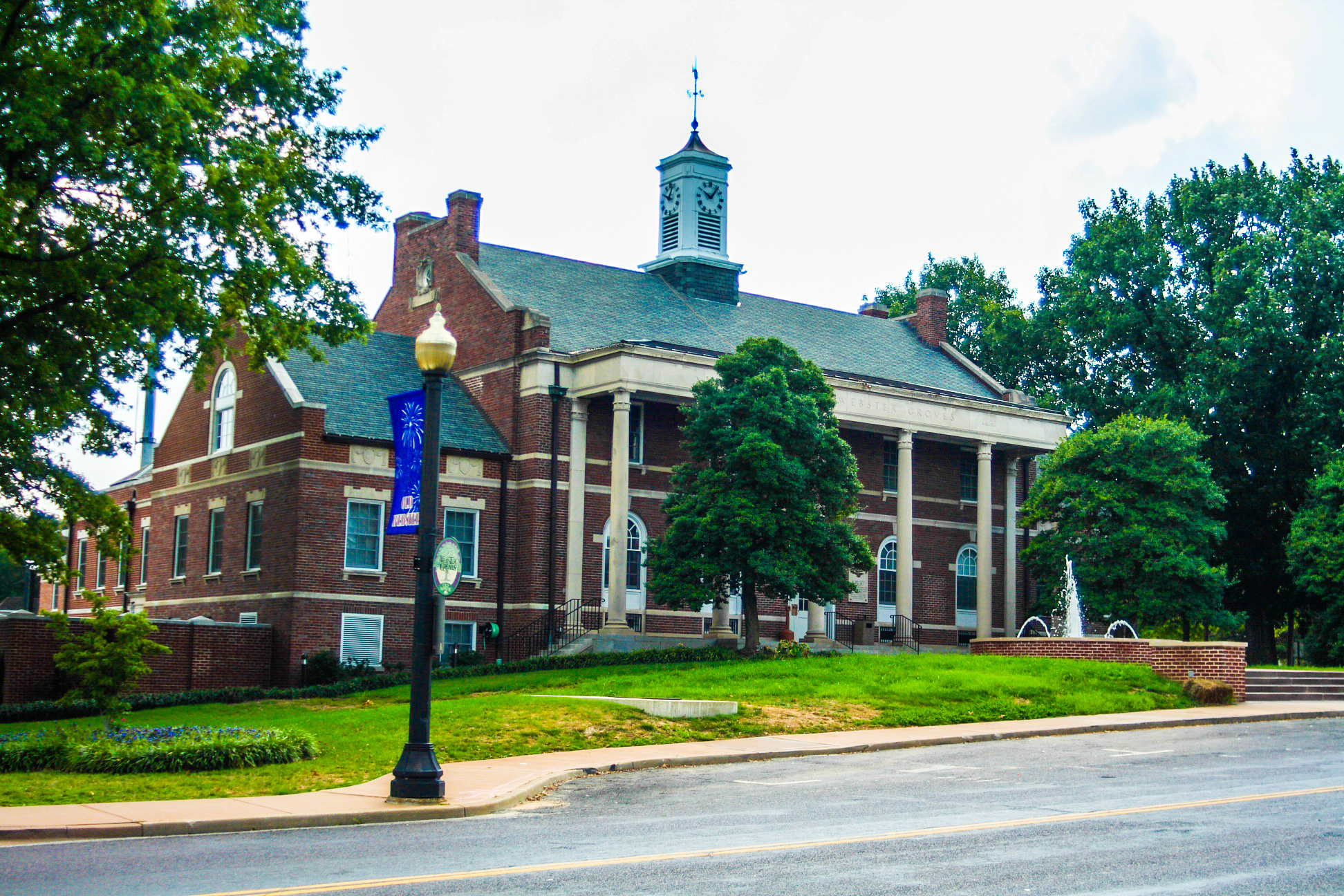
Webster Groves City Hall

As of 2018, Gerry Welch was the mayor of Webster Groves.

The City Council works with 19 boards and commissions (16 active, three inactive). Citizens and businesspeople in the area volunteer for these boards and commissions to advise the City Council on community issues. A full list of these boards and commissions with links to pages describing the purpose and application procedures can be found on the official website of Webster Groves.

The Municipal Court is conducted on the second Wednesday of the month at 5:30 pm and the fourth Wednesday of the month at 6:00 pm in the City Council Chambers at the City Hall. The Prosecuting Attorney is Deborah LeMoine and the Municipal Judge is James Whitney.

== Demographics ==
Historical population
Census	Pop.	Note	%±
1890	1,783		—
1900	1,895		6.3%
1910	7,080		273.6%
1920	9,474		33.8%
1930	16,487		74.0%
1940	18,394		11.6%
1950	23,390		27.2%
1960	28,990		23.9%
1970	27,457		−5.3%
1980	23,097		−15.9%
1990	22,987		−0.5%
2000	23,230		1.1%
2010	22,995		−1.0%
2020	24,010		4.4%
U.S. Decennial Census

=== Racial and ethnic composition ===
Webster Groves city, Missouri – Racial and ethnic composition Note: the US Census treats Hispanic/Latino as an ethnic category. This table excludes Latinos from the racial categories and assigns them to a separate category. Hispanics/Latinos may be of any race.
Race / Ethnicity (NH = Non-Hispanic)	Pop 2000	Pop 2010	Pop 2020	% 2000	% 2010	% 2020
White alone (NH)	20,927	20,384	20,677	90.09%	88.65%	86.12%
Black or African American alone (NH)	1,472	1,514	1,146	6.34%	6.58%	4.77%
Native American or Alaska Native alone (NH)	28	39	20	0.12%	0.17%	0.08%
Asian alone (NH)	278	343	391	1.20%	1.49%	1.63%
Native Hawaiian or Pacific Islander alone (NH)	3	3	3	0.01%	0.01%	0.01%
Other race alone (NH)	10	25	87	0.04%	0.11%	0.36%
Mixed race or Multiracial (NH)	221	322	953	0.95%	1.40%	3.97%
Hispanic or Latino (any race)	291	365	733	1.25%	1.59%	3.05%
Total	23,230	22,995	24,010	100.00%	100.00%	100.00%

=== 2020 census ===
As of the 2020 census, Webster Groves had a population of 24,010 and a population density of 4,062.6 inhabitants per square mile (1,568.6/km^{2}). The median age was 41.0 years. 23.9% of residents were under the age of 18 and 20.4% of residents were 65 years of age or older. For every 100 females there were 89.4 males, and for every 100 females age 18 and over there were 84.0 males age 18 and over.

100.0% of residents lived in urban areas, while 0.0% lived in rural areas.

There were 9,334 households and 5,858 families in Webster Groves, of which 32.4% had children under the age of 18 living in them. Of all households, 56.0% were married-couple households, 12.4% were households with a male householder and no spouse or partner present, and 27.7% were households with a female householder and no spouse or partner present. About 29.2% of all households were made up of individuals and 17.7% had someone living alone who was 65 years of age or older.

There were 9,909 housing units, of which 5.8% were vacant. The homeowner vacancy rate was 1.6% and the rental vacancy rate was 9.1%.

Racial composition as of the 2020 census
Race	Number	Percent
White	20,874	86.9%
Black or African American	1,161	4.8%
American Indian and Alaska Native	34	0.1%
Asian	397	1.7%
Native Hawaiian and Other Pacific Islander	3	0.0%
Some other race	183	0.8%
Two or more races	1,358	5.7%
Hispanic or Latino (of any race)	733	3.1%

=== 2016–2020 American Community Survey ===
The 2016–2020 5-year American Community Survey estimates show that the median household income was $94,479 (with a margin of error of +/- $9,681) and the median family income was $133,010 (+/- $12,359). Males had a median income of $70,625 (+/- $5,023) versus $46,405 (+/- $9,714) for females. The median income for those above 16 years old was $58,823 (+/- $5,413). Approximately, 2.3% of families and 3.9% of the population were below the poverty line, including 3.4% of those under the age of 18 and 3.6% of those ages 65 or over.

=== 2010 census ===
As of the census of 2010, there were 22,995 people, 9,156 households, and 6,024 families living in the city. The population density was 3,897.5 inhabitants per square mile (1,504.8/km^{2}). There were 9,756 housing units at an average density of 1,653.6 per square mile (638.5/km^{2}). The racial makeup of the city was 89.9% White, 6.6% African American, 0.2% Native American, 1.5% Asian, 0.3% from other races, and 1.5% from two or more races. Hispanic or Latino of any race were 1.6% of the population.

There were 9,156 households, of which 32.6% had children under the age of 18 living with them, 54.3% were married couples living together, 8.7% had a female householder with no husband present, 2.8% had a male householder with no wife present, and 34.2% were non-families. 28.9% of all households were made up of individuals, and 13.8% had someone living alone who was 65 years of age or older. The average household size was 2.43 and the average family size was 3.04.

The median age in the city was 40.8 years. 24.6% of residents were under the age of 18; 8.1% were between the ages of 18 and 24; 22.6% were from 25 to 44; 29.2% were from 45 to 64; and 15.4% were 65 years of age or older. The gender makeup of the city was 47.1% male and 52.9% female.

=== 2000 census ===
As of the census of 2000, there were 23,230 people, 9,498 households, and 6,145 families living in the city. The population density was 3,937.5 inhabitants per square mile (1,520.3/km^{2}). There were 9,903 housing units at an average density of 1,678.6 per square mile (648.1/km^{2}). The racial makeup of the city was 90.87% White, 6.38% African American, 1.21% Asian, 0.17% Native American, 0.01% Pacific Islander, 0.31% from other races, and 1.05% from two or more races. Hispanic or Latino of any race were 1.25% of the population.

There were 9,498 households, out of which 31.0% had children under the age of 18 living with them, 53.9% were married couples living together, 9.0% had a female householder with no husband present, and 35.3% were non-families. 30.6% of all households were made up of individuals, and 15.4% had someone living alone who was 65 years of age or older. The average household size was 2.39 and the average family size was 3.03.

In the city, the age distribution of the population shows 24.9% under the age of 18, 7.4% from 18 to 24, 26.7% from 25 to 44, 23.7% from 45 to 64, and 17.3% who were 65 years of age or older. The median age was 40 years. For every 100 females, there were 84.8 males. For every 100 females age 18 and over, there were 79.4 males.

As of 2000 the median income for a household was $60,524, and the median income for a family was $73,998. Males had a median income of $57,801 versus $38,506 for females. The per capita income for the city was $31,327. 4.8% of the population and 2.0% of families were below the poverty line. 5.0% of those under the age of 18 and 3.5% of those 65 and older were living below the poverty line.

== Education ==
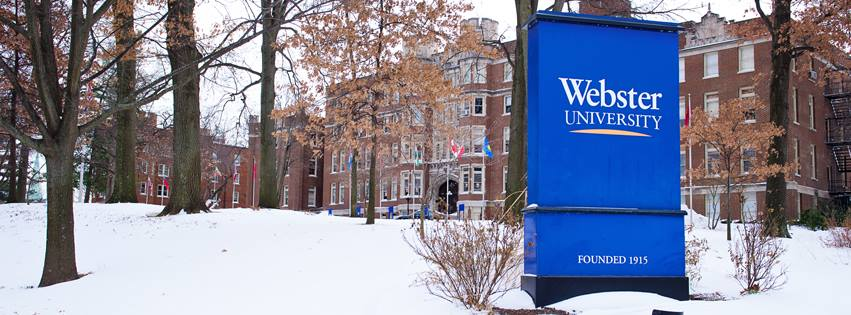
Webster University

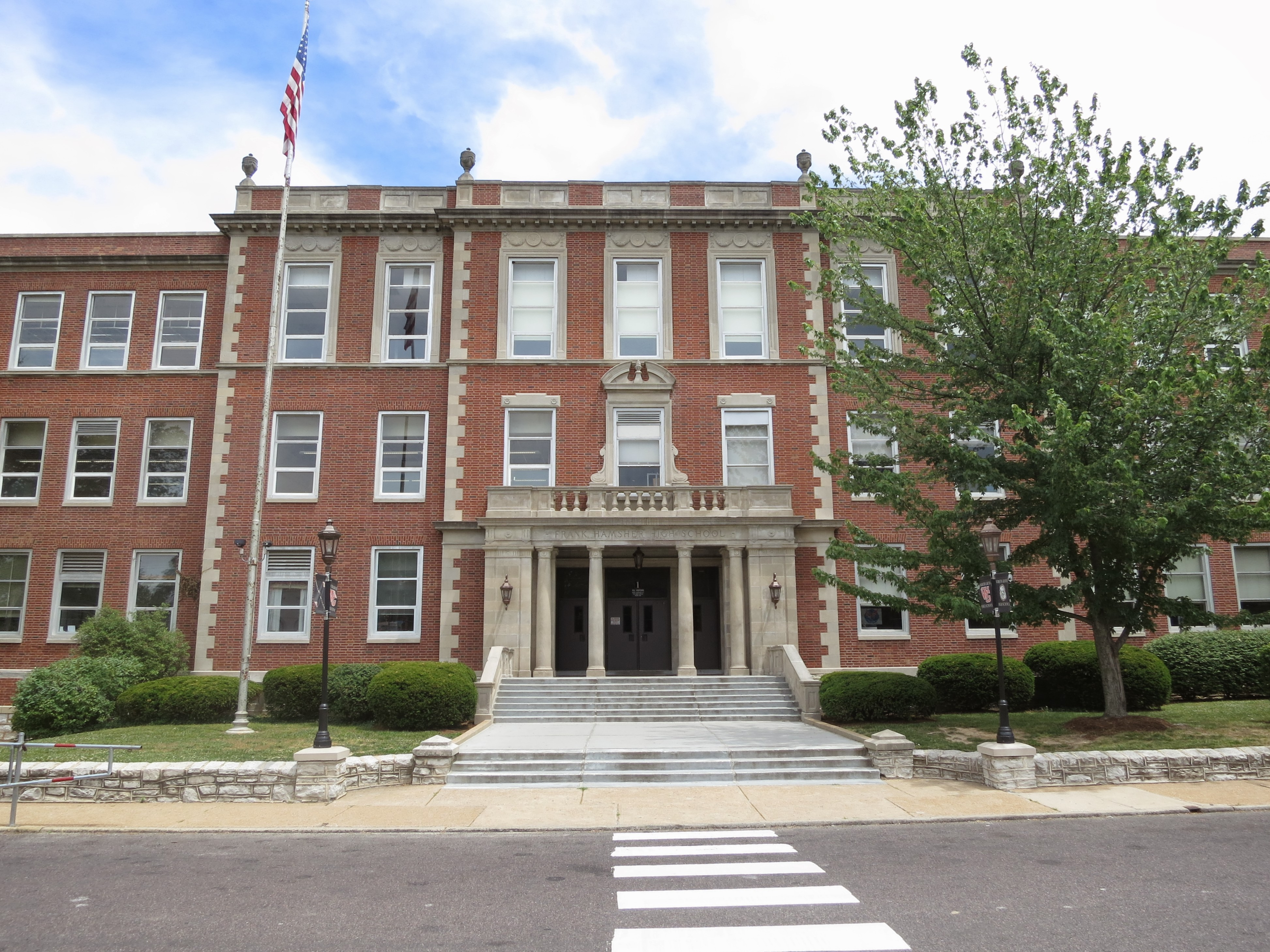
Webster Groves High School

The Webster Groves School District serves the city. Webster Groves High School is in the city.

Webster University is in the city. Across from Webster University is Eden Theological Seminary, a theological seminary of the United Church of Christ.

Private schools in Webster Groves:

- Christ Community Lutheran School
- Queen of Holy Rosary School
- Holy Cross Academy, a Catholic middle school located at Annunciation Catholic Church. The school serves several inner-ring suburb Catholic parishes.
- Holy Redeemer, located on Lockwood, has had a Catholic elementary school since 1898.
- Mary Queen of Peace, also on Lockwood, serves Catholics of Webster Groves and adjoining Glendale. The parish was founded in 1922; the Sisters of Loretto formed the first kindergarten class in 1944.
- Nerinx Hall High School, an all-girls Catholic high school, was founded by the Sisters of Loretto in 1924. It adjoins the campus of Webster University, which the sisters founded in 1915. The University is now run by a lay board, while Nerinx remains Catholic.

The St. Louis Japanese School, a weekend supplementary Japanese school, holds its classes at the Sverdrup Business/Technology Complex at Webster University.

Webster Groves has a public library, the City Of Webster Groves Municipal Library.

== Landmarks and historic places ==
Webster Groves is home to:

- Eden Theological Seminary
- Charles W. Ferguson House
- Gorlock Building
- Hawken House
- Nerinx Hall High School
- Opera Theatre of Saint Louis
- The Repertory Theatre of St. Louis
- Rock House, Edgewood Children's Center
- Rockwood Court Apartments
- Tuxedo Park Christian Church
- Tuxedo Park Station
- Webster Groves High School
- Webster University

Registered historic districts in Webster Groves include:

- Webster College-Eden Theological Seminary Collegiate District
- Central Webster Historic District
- Marshall Place Historic District
- Old Webster Historic District
- Webster Park Residential Historic District

== Notable people ==
Notable people who have lived in Webster Groves include:

(Dates in parentheses indicate lifespan, not years of residence.)

- Bruce Alger (1918–2015), Republican U.S. Representative from Dallas, Texas, 1955–1965
- Herbert Blumer (1900–1987), sociologist
- Matt Bomer (born 1977), actor
- Oscar Brockmeyer (1883–1954), soccer player and 1904 Olympian
- Bud Byerly (1920–2012), Major League Baseball pitcher
- George H. Cannon (1915–1941), Medal of Honor recipient
- Harry Caray (1914–1998), baseball broadcaster
- Skip Caray (1939–2008), baseball broadcaster
- Bob Cassilly (1949–2011), artist and founder of the City Museum
- Adrian Clayborn (born 1988), college and professional football player
- David Clewell (1955–2020), Poet Laureate of Missouri 2010–2012
- John J. Cochran (1880–1947), Democratic U.S. Representative from Missouri, 1926–1947
- Ivory Crockett (born 1948), 100-yard dash world-record holder
- Chris Culver, The New York Times bestselling author
- Thomas Bradford Curtis (1911–1993), Republican U.S. Representative from Missouri, 1951–1969
- Michael J. Devlin (born 1965), convicted kidnapper and child molester
- Phyllis Diller (1917–2012), comedian
- Forrest C. Donnell (1884–1980), governor of Missouri, 1941–1945
- Bob Dotson (born 1946), NBC news journalist
- Tim Dunigan (born 1955), actor
- Mary Engelbreit (born 1952), artist and illustrator
- Clay Felker (1925–2008), co-founder of New York magazine
- Lois Florreich (1927–1991), pitcher in the All-American Girls Professional Baseball League, 1943–1950
- Jonathan Franzen (born 1959), National Book Award-winning novelist
- Edward T. Hall (1914–2009), anthropologist
- Robert A. Holekamp (1848–1922), businessman and apiarist
- Alan Hunter (born 1957), original MTV VJ, radio host, and film and TV producer
- Gordon Jenkins (1910–1984), music arranger
- Josephine Johnson (1910–1990), Pulitzer Prize-winning novelist
- John Keene (born 1965), writer, translator, artist, academic
- Matt Kindt (born 1973), comic book artist and graphic designer
- Karlie Kloss (born 1992), model
- Jim Krebs (1935–1965), NBA basketball player, Minneapolis/Los Angeles Lakers
- Frederick Kreismann (1869–1944), mayor of St. Louis, 1909–1913
- Hank Kuhlmann (born 1937), college and professional football coach
- Laura Les (born 1994), member of hyperpop band 100 gecs
- Jack Lorenz (1939–2009), environmental activist
- John Lutz (1939–2021), mystery writer
- Susan Louise Marsh (1867–1946), activist and children's advocate
- Marguerite Martyn (1878–1948), reporter and artist
- Scott Mayfield (born 1992), ice hockey player
- Kathleen Mazzarella, Chairman, President and CEO of Graybar
- Danny McCarthy, actor
- Louis Metcalf (1905–1981), jazz cornetist
- Russ Mitchell (born 1960), news anchor of The Early Show on CBS
- Keith W. Nolan (1964–2009), military historian
- Scott Phillips (born 1961), writer
- Edward M. Rice (born 1960), Auxiliary Bishop of the Roman Catholic Archdiocese of St. Louis, Dec. 2010–present
- Drew Sarich (born 1975), actor, musical theater
- George Schlatter (born 1929), American television comedy producer and director
- Jane Smiley (born 1949), Pulitzer Prize-winning novelist
- Phoebe Snetsinger (1931–1999), birdwatcher
- William H. Webster (1924–2025), FBI and CIA director
- Thomas Crane Young, architect who served as mayor from 1901-1903
