= William Trowbridge (poet) =

American academic and poet

William Trowbridge is an American academic and poet who was a Poet Laureate in the American state of Missouri.

Trowbridge holds a B.A. in philosophy and an M.A. in English from the University of Missouri and a Ph.D. in English from Vanderbilt University. He served as Poet Laureate of the State of Missouri from 2012 to 2016.

Trowbridge is a Distinguished University Professor Emeritus at Northwest Missouri State University, where he was an editor of The Laurel Review/GreenTower Press from 1986 to 2004. He has given readings and workshops at schools, colleges, bookstores, and literary conferences throughout the United States. He teaches in the University of Nebraska low-residency MFA in writing program. He may be followed at wtrowbridge.net

His poems have appeared in Poetry, The Gettysburg Review, Crazyhorse, The Georgia Review, Boulevard, The Southern Review, Columbia, Colorado Review, The Iowa Review, Prairie Schooner, Epoch, and New Letters.

Trowbridge lives in Lee's Summit, Missouri with his wife Sue. The couple have three children: Jennifer, Sean, and Randy; and three grandchildren: Sarah, Will, and Alice.

== Awards ==
- Academy of American Poets Prize
- Pushcart Prize
- Bread Loaf Writers’ Conference scholarship,
- Camber Press Poetry Chapbook Award
- fellowships from The MacDowell Colony, Ragdale, Yaddo, and The Anderson Center.

== Poetry publications ==
- "MAINTENANCE" (Spartan Press, 2025)
- "FATHER AND SON" (WSC Press, 2024)
- CALL ME FOOL (Red Hen Press, 2022)
- OLDGUY: SUPERHERO, The Complete Collection (Red Hen Press, 2019)
- Oldguy: Superhero Comic book with art by Tim Mayer(Red Hen Press, 2016)
- Vanishing Point (Red Hen Press, 2017)
- Put This On, Please (Red Hen Press, 2014)
- Ship of Fool (Red Hen Press, 2011)
- The Complete Book of Kong (Southeast Missouri State University Press, 2003)
- Flickers, O Paradise
- Enter Dark Stranger (University of Arkansas Press, 2000, 1995, 1989)
- The Packing House Cantata (Camber Press, 2006)
- The Four Seasons (Red Dragonfly Press, 2001) you
- The Book of Kong (Iowa State University Press, 1986)
