= Stevens Institute of Business and Arts =

Private for-profit college in St. Louis, Missouri, USA

Coordinates: 38.632897°N 90.202517°W

Stevens-The Institute of Business & Arts
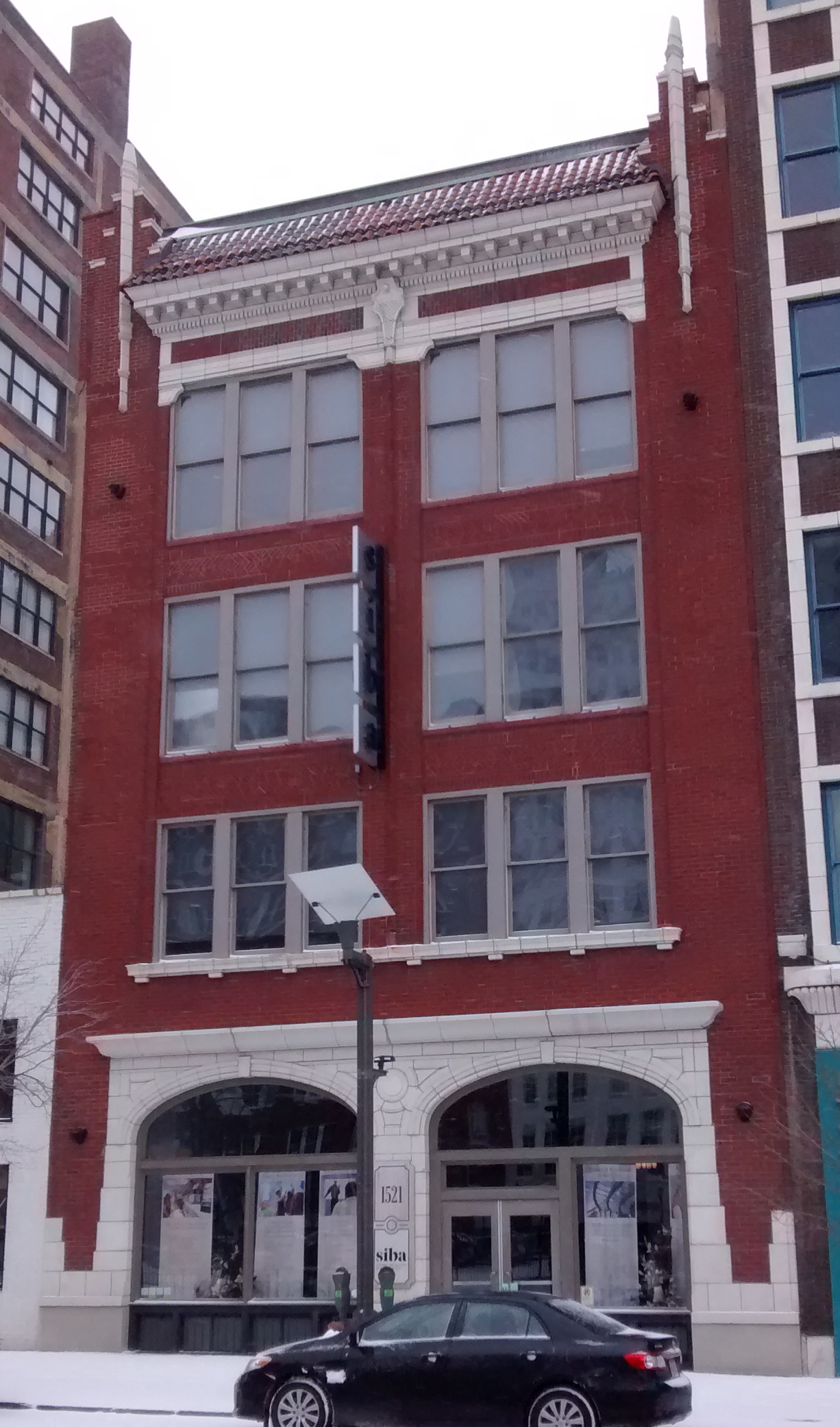
- Former names: Patricia Stevens College
- Type: Private for-profit college
- Established: 1947
- Accreditation: Accrediting Commission of Career Schools and Colleges
- Budget: $3 million
- President: Cynthia Musterman
- Academic staff: 20 (7 full, 13 part)
- Students: 145 (2016)
- Location: St. Louis, Missouri, United States
- Campus: Urban 25,000 square feet
- Website: www.siba.edu

Stevens - The Institute of Business and Arts (SIBA) is a private for-profit college in St. Louis, Missouri. Founded in 1947, it offers associate and bachelor's degrees.

== History ==
Stevens – The Institute of Business & Arts got its start in 1947 as the St. Louis affiliate of Patricia Stevens, a modeling and “finishing” school for young women. Patricia Stevens herself was a working fashion model, and there were many schools bearing her name around the country, but the one in St. Louis was operated by the Klute family. In addition to modeling and comportment classes, young women could also take courses that would aid in them in the post-WWII work world – think secretarial skills.

Over the years, Patricia Stevens’ catalog of offerings expanded to include not just short-term certificate and diploma programs, but also Associates and bachelor's degrees. The school's longest-running programs, which are still among its most popular, are the Retail Management/Fashion Merchandising and the Interior Design programs. One other major change to this once-all-girls college was the addition of men. The school now functions as a completely co-educational environment.

== Campus ==
In 2010, the school moved to its new, permanent location on Washington Avenue in the city's revitalized garment district. The building, originally built in 1917 for the George E Keith shoe factory underwent a $3 million renovation. The 24,000+ square foot campus is located at 1521 Washington Avenue and situated in the heart of the St. Louis Loft district, within walking distance of attractions such as the City Museum, the main branch of the St. Louis Public Library, St. Louis University Law Library, and numerous parks, coffee shops, boutiques, and restaurants. The campus is accessible by public transportation, and there are a number of public parking lots close by. The interior of the building was designed specifically for Siba's needs, and provides ample space for instruction, study, and social interaction.

== Organization and administration ==
Siba is an independent, proprietary institution owned and operated by BGB Associates, LLC, a registered Missouri corporation. The sole shareholder is Cynthia Musterman. The college is organized and authorized to conduct its operation in accordance with the laws of the State of Missouri.

Siba works on a rolling admissions system, and all application materials submitted for admission must be on file no later than one week prior to final registration for the beginning of a term. The school runs on a quarterly basis and has enrollments in the Winter, Spring, Summer, and Fall.

== See also ==
- Downtown St. Louis
- National Register of Historic Places listings in Downtown and Downtown West St. Louis (#117)
