= St. Joseph's Academy (Missouri) =

All-girls high school in Missouri, US

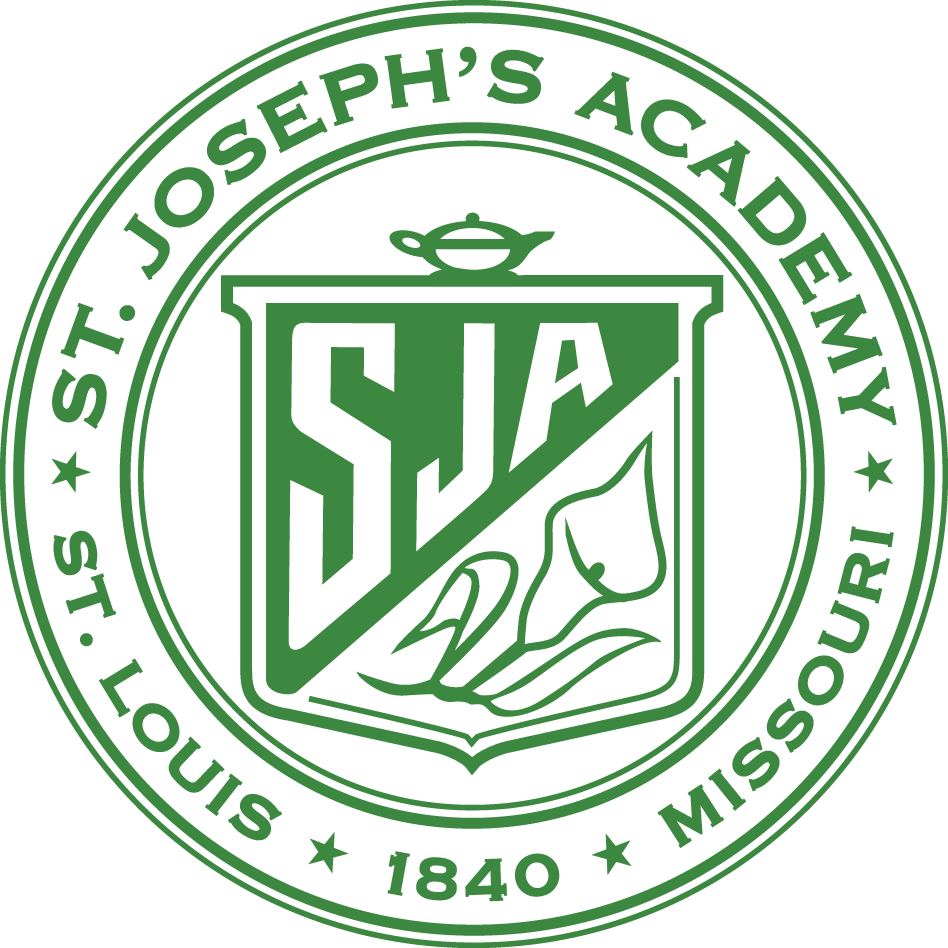

Location
- 2307 South Lindbergh Boulevard; Frontenac, Missouri 63131; United States; 38°37′30.34″N 90°24′28.4″W

Information
- Type: Private college-preparatory school
- Motto: "Not I, But We"
- Religious affiliation: Roman Catholic
- Established: 1840; 186 years ago
- President: Marcia Niedringhaus
- Faculty: 49.1 (on an FTE basis)
- Grades: 9–12
- Gender: Girls
- Enrollment: 587 (2023–24)
- Colors: Green and white
- Athletics conference: GISL
- Nickname: Angels
- Accreditation: Cognia
- Newspaper: The Voice
- Yearbook: The Echo
- Tuition: $21,990 (2026–27)
- Website: sja1840.org

St. Joseph's Academy, commonly known as St. Joe's or SJA, is a Catholic, all-girls, college-preparatory school in Frontenac, Missouri, a suburb of St. Louis. The school is sponsored by the Sisters of St. Joseph of Carondelet.

== History ==
St. Joseph's Academy was founded as Mother Celestine's in 1840. Mother St. John Fontbonne and the Superior Sisters of St. Joseph were sent from Lyon, France to the territories of Cahokia and Carondelet. Upon their arrival, they opened a convent school.

In 1841, Mother Celestine's moved from the log cabin that it had been founded in to a motherhouse in Carondelet, Missouri. In 1925, the academy moved into Clayton, Missouri along with Fontbonne University. In 1946, the campus became too small for both the high school and the college, so the academy abandoned the city and moved to Frontenac, Missouri. In 1955, the new building opened.

== Athletics ==
SJA is a full member of the Missouri State High School Activities Association (MSHSAA) and one of nine members of the Girls Independent Schools League.

In 2022, the Angels golf team won their seventh consecutive state title with a team total of 640 points while second-place Blue Springs South scored 699.

The Angels have won 57 state titles across seven MSHSAA-sponsored sports as of the 2025–26 school year.

- Basketball (6): 1975, 1991, 1992, 1993, 1994, 2004
- Cross country (1): 2023
- Golf (12): 1995, 1996, 1998, 2000, 2005, 2016–2022
- Soccer (8): 1990, 1992, 1998–1999, 2001–2002, 2014, 2025
- Swimming and diving (2): 1983, 2025
- Tennis (19): 1976–1977, 1994–1998, 2000–2001, 2004–2008, 2012, 2019, 2021–2022, 2024
- Volleyball (9): 1990–1993, 1998–1999, 2008, 2010, 2017

== Notable alumnae ==
- Tisha Terrasini Banker, actress
- Kristin Folkl, professional basketball player
- Molly McNearney, television writer and producer; wife of Jimmy Kimmel
