= Frontenac, Missouri =

- City
- Aerial photo of the city facing eastward on Clayton Road. September 2026.

- Location of Frontenac, Missouri

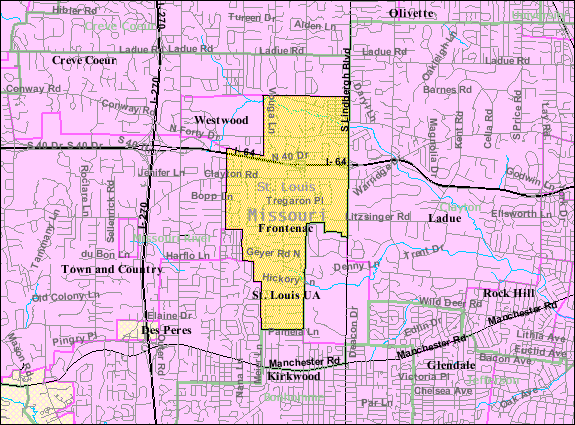
- U.S. Census reference map.
- Coordinates: 38°37′48″N 90°25′08″W
- Country: United States
- State: Missouri
- County: St. Louis

Government
  - Mayor: Patrick "Pat" Kilker

Area
  - Total: 2.88 sq mi (7.46 km^{2})
  - Land: 2.88 sq mi (7.46 km^{2})
  - Water: 0 sq mi (0.00 km^{2})
- Elevation: 640 ft (200 m)

Population (2020)
  - Total: 3,612
  - Density: 1,253.6/sq mi (484.02/km^{2})
- Time zone: UTC-6 (Central (CST))
  - Summer (DST): UTC-5 (CDT)
- ZIP code: 63131
- Area code: 314
- FIPS code: 29-26110
- GNIS feature ID: 2394829
- Website: Frontenac, Missouri

Frontenac is a city in St. Louis County, Missouri, United States. The population was 3,612 at the 2020 census.

The community name is inspired by the New France governor Louis de Buade de Frontenac. Benjamin and Lora Wood, who laid out the community's core called Frontenac Estates, that consisted of 26 two-acre estates, had made frequent trips to Quebec. The community was incorporated as 217 acres (88 ha) in 1947 and annexed another 967 acres (391 ha) in 1948. The community still consists mostly of houses on one-acre lots. French architecture is encouraged in design.

== Geography ==
According to the United States Census Bureau, the city has a total area of 2.88 square miles (7.46 km^{2}), all land.

== Demographics ==
Historical population
Census	Pop.	Note	%±
1950	1,099		—
1960	3,089		181.1%
1970	3,920		26.9%
1980	3,654		−6.8%
1990	3,374		−7.7%
2000	3,483		3.2%
2010	3,482		0.0%
2020	3,612		3.7%
U.S. Decennial Census

=== Racial and ethnic composition ===
Frontenac city, Missouri – Racial and ethnic composition Note: the US Census treats Hispanic/Latino as an ethnic category. This table excludes Latinos from the racial categories and assigns them to a separate category. Hispanics/Latinos may be of any race.
Race / Ethnicity (NH = Non-Hispanic)	Pop 2000	Pop 2010	Pop 2020	% 2000	% 2010	% 2020
White alone (NH)	3,286	3,100	2,948	94.34%	89.03%	81.62%
Black or African American alone (NH)	28	89	84	0.80%	2.56%	2.33%
Native American or Alaska Native alone (NH)	3	5	1	0.09%	0.14%	0.03%
Asian alone (NH)	97	195	337	2.78%	5.60%	9.33%
Native Hawaiian or Pacific Islander alone (NH)	0	0	0	0.00%	0.00%	0.00%
Other race alone (NH)	2	5	25	0.06%	0.14%	0.69%
Mixed race or Multiracial (NH)	34	37	124	0.98%	1.06%	3.43%
Hispanic or Latino (any race)	33	51	93	0.95%	1.46%	2.57%
Total	3,483	3,482	3,612	100.00%	100.00%	100.00%

=== 2020 census ===
As of the 2020 census, Frontenac had a population of 3,612. The median age was 47.8 years. 24.3% of residents were under the age of 18 and 22.0% were 65 years of age or older. For every 100 females, there were 96.8 males, and for every 100 females age 18 and over, there were 90.9 males age 18 and over.

100.0% of residents lived in urban areas, while 0.0% lived in rural areas.

There were 1,274 households, of which 37.6% had children under the age of 18 living in them. Of all households, 74.7% were married-couple households, 8.3% were households with a male householder and no spouse or partner present, and 14.7% were households with a female householder and no spouse or partner present. About 14.6% of all households were made up of individuals, and 9.7% had someone living alone who was 65 years of age or older.

There were 1,335 housing units, of which 4.6% were vacant. The homeowner vacancy rate was 1.6%, and the rental vacancy rate was 4.9%.

=== 2010 census ===
As of the census of 2010, there were 3,482 people, 1,267 households, and 1,036 families living in the city. The population density was 1,209.0 inhabitants per square mile (466.8/km^{2}). There were 1,357 housing units at an average density of 471.2 per square mile (181.9/km^{2}). The racial makeup of the city was 90.1% White, 2.6% African American, 0.1% Native American, 5.6% Asian, 0.3% from other races, and 1.2% from two or more races. Hispanic or Latino residents of any race were 1.5% of the population.

There were 1,267 households, of which 34.6% had children under the age of 18 living with them, 73.3% were married couples living together, 5.4% had a female householder with no husband present, 3.0% had a male householder with no wife present, and 18.2% were non-families. 16.1% of all households were made up of individuals, and 8.6% had someone living alone who was 65 years of age or older. The average household size was 2.70 and the average family size was 3.03.

The median age in the city was 49.2 years. 24.9% of residents were under the age of 18; 5.3% were between the ages of 18 and 24; 13.1% were from 25 to 44; 35.5% were from 45 to 64; and 21.3% were 65 years of age or older. The gender makeup of the city was 47.6% male and 52.4% female.

== Education ==
- Ladue School District, a public school district serving Frontenac.
- St. Joseph's Academy, an all-girls high school.
- Chaminade College Preparatory School, an all-boys middle and high school.
- Villa Duchesne and Oak Hill School, a Sacred Heart School for boys and girls grades JK-6 and young women grades 7-12.
- Kirkwood School District, serves parts of South Frontenac.

== See also ==
- Plaza Frontenac
