= Rockwood School District =

School district in Missouri, United States

Coordinates: 38°30′37″N 90°37′26″W

Rockwood R-VI School District

Location
- Eureka, Missouri St. Louis County United States

District information
- Type: Local school district
- Grades: K–12
- Superintendent: Dr. Curtis Cain
- Schools: 31
- Budget: $375,317,878 (2025–26)
- NCES District ID: 2926850

Students and staff
- Students: 21,130 (2018–19)
- Teachers: 1,477.42 FTE
- Staff: 2,206.55 FTE
- Student–teacher ratio: 14.30

Other information
- Website: www.rsdmo.org

Rockwood R-VI School District is a public school district headquartered in Eureka, Missouri, serving students in St. Louis County. The Rockwood School District is St. Louis County's largest public school system, serving 19,886 students.

There are nineteen elementary schools, six middle schools, and five high schools in the district, with an average of 19 students per classroom teacher. There are 3,318 staff as of October 2012.

Covering 150 square miles (390 km^{2}) in parts of western St. Louis County and northern Jefferson County, Rockwood serves approximately 141,000 residents in over 53,000 households. Eight distinct communities are within Rockwood's boundaries, including all or parts of Ballwin (pop. 30,404), Chesterfield (pop. 47,484), Clarkson Valley (pop. 2,632), Ellisville (pop. 9,133), Eureka (pop. 10,759), Fenton (pop. 4,022), Wildwood (pop. 35,517), and Winchester (pop. 1,547).

== Schools ==
=== High schools ===
- Eureka High School
- Lafayette High School
- Marquette High School
- Rockwood Summit High School
- Individualized Learning Center

=== Middle schools ===
==== Crestview Middle School ====
Crestview Middle School is a middle school in Clarkson Valley, Missouri. It is housed in the building formerly used by Lafayette High School, another school within Rockwood District, and is Rockwood's largest middle school. The mascot is Hector the Trojan. Most of its students matriculate to Marquette High School, but some go on to Lafayette High School. The feeder schools are Ellisville Elementary, Kehrs Mill Elementary, Westridge Elementary, and Wild Horse Elementary. Crestview is home to 1,239 students and over 100 teachers.

==== LaSalle Springs Middle School ====
LaSalle Springs Middle School is a middle school in Wildwood, Missouri. Built halfway through the 1993 school year, Lasalle Springs enrolled 881 students in the 2018–19 school year. Students enrolling in LaSalle go on to attend Eureka High School.

At LaSalle, the average number of years of experience for teachers is 14.8 years. 98.4% of teachers have regular certificates, and 83.2% have advanced degrees.

==== Rockwood South Middle School ====
Rockwood South Middle School is a middle school in Fenton, Missouri. Rockwood South enrolled 948 students in the 2018–19 school year. Its alumni advance to Rockwood Summit High School.

==== Rockwood Valley Middle School ====
Rockwood Valley Middle School is a middle school in Wildwood, Missouri. The school was established in 1992. It enrolled 666 students in the 2018–19 school year, and 710 in the 2020–21 school year. Rockwood Valley alumni attend Lafayette High School. The average number of years of experience for teachers is 15.1 years. 78.0% of teachers have advanced degrees. The proportional attendance rate is 90.8. The ratio of students to regular classroom teachers is 15:1.

==== Selvidge Middle School ====
Morgan Selvidge Middle School is a middle school in Ballwin. The school was established in 1968. Its namesake is Morgan Selvidge, who was superintendent of the school district during the years of 1949–1970. In 2008, the school received an award called Recognized ASCA Model Program (RAMP) from the American School Counselor Association. It is Missouri's second school to receive this recognition. As of 2018–19, the school has an enrollment of 693 students in grades 6–8. There is 48 teachers on staff. Students who attend Selvidge Middle School matriculate to Marquette High School.

==== Wildwood Middle School ====
Wildwood Middle School is a middle school in Wildwood, Missouri. Students are sourced almost equally from Fairway Elementary, Green Pines Elementary, and from Pond Elementary. In the 2018–19 school year it enrolled 647 students. Approximately two-thirds of its students attend Eureka High School, and approximately one-third of them attend Lafayette High School.

=== Elementary schools ===
- Babler Elementary School
- Ballwin Elementary School
- Blevins Elementary School
- Bowles Elementary School
- Chesterfield Elementary School
- Ellisville Elementary School
- Eureka Elementary School
- Fairway Elementary School
- Geggie Elementary School
- Green Pines Elementary School
- Kehrs Mill Elementary School
- Kellison Elementary School
- Pond Elementary School
- Ridge Meadows Elementary School
- Stanton Elementary School
- Uthoff Valley Elementary School
- Westridge Elementary School
- Wild Horse Elementary School
- Woerther Elementary School

=== Early Childhood Centers ===
- Early Childhood Center at Clarkson Valley
- Early Childhood Center at Vandover Campus
- Eureka Early Childhood Center

=== Special Campuses ===
- CCL (Center for Creative Learning)
  - Located in Ellisville, Missouri. This is a center for gifted learning, normally occupied by elementary students.

== Notable alumni ==
- David Freese, MLB player, graduated from Lafayette High School in 2001
- Ryan Howard, MLB player, graduated from Lafayette High School in 1998
- Nikolas Schiller, prominent map artist, graduated from Marquette High School
- Michael Johnson, MMA fighter, graduated from Marquette High School
- Dan Connolly, NFL player, graduated from Marquette High School
- Maurice Alexander, NFL player, graduated from Eureka High School
- Cam Janssen, NHL player, graduated from Eureka High School
- Kevin Donahue, NASCAR driver, graduated from Lafayette High School in 2013
- Kyle Donahue, NASCAR driver, graduated from Lafayette High School in 2018
- Hassan Haskins, NFL player, graduated from Eureka High School in 2018
