= Rockwood Summit High School =

American high school in St. Louis County, MO

Location
- 1780 Hawkins Road; Fenton, Missouri 63026; United States; 38°31′01″N 90°29′35″W

Information
- Type: Comprehensive high school
- Motto: One Summit. One Legacy. Inspiring Excellence.
- Established: 1993; 33 years ago
- School district: Rockwood School District
- Superintendent: Curtis Cain
- Principal: Emily McCown
- Teaching staff: 77.78 (on an FTE basis)
- Grades: 9–12
- Enrollment: 1,215 (2023–24)
- Student to teacher ratio: 15.62
- Colors: Maroon and black
- Athletics conference: Suburban Conference
- Nickname: Falcons
- Newspaper: Talon
- Yearbook: Pinnacle
- Affiliations: KFTN-LP (92.7 FM)
- Website: rsummit.rsdmo.org

Rockwood Summit High School (also known as Summit High School or RSHS) is a public high school in unincorporated St. Louis County, Missouri, that is part of the Rockwood School District. Summit opened in 1993 on the same day as Marquette High School, another Rockwood high school.

== History ==
In early 1992, the Rockwood School District determined that two new high schools were needed to serve an expanding population. After voters approved construction of the schools in March 1992, the Rockwood Board of Education unanimously voted to name the new southeast high school Rockwood Summit High School. In May 1992, the board named Tom Hensley as the school's first principal, and construction began that summer according to designs by the William B. Ittner architectural firm. Rock blasting was required to construct the building, increasing the cost by $207,000. The original estimate for the building was $17 million; the total cost upon completion was $22.7 million, although the school was built with a combined cafeteria and theater to save $2.5 million. Of the $22.7 million cost of the building, $400,000 was spent on pool facilities, $780,000 on roofing and sheet metal, $995,000 on masonry, and $200,000 on data and voice networks. When built, Summit featured a two-story commons and atrium, 77 classrooms, several computer labs, and art, music, and theater facilities. The school opened on September 7, 1993, on the same day as Marquette High School, the first time a school district in the St. Louis area had opened two new high schools on the same day. It opened with 635 ninth- and tenth-grade students.

In 1998, Summit's first principal, Tom Hensley, retired after 26 years in the district; his replacement, Larry Berneking, transferred from Eureka High School. In 1999, the school became the first in the St. Louis area to sponsor an equestrian club; in its first year, the club had a dozen members and offered a variety of activities related to horseback riding.

Within five years of its opening, the school district received approval for a bond issue to provide an auditorium and additional classrooms at Summit during the 1998–1999 school year. According to a construction manager, the Summit addition included 34,000 square feet of new space, consisting of six classrooms on two floors, at a cost of $2.7 million, and its auditorium was completed during the winter of 1999. As with the original building, the plans for the addition were completed by William B. Ittner, Inc., and the new auditorium and office space created a courtyard in front of the school. Summit also gained 120 parking spaces. During the expansion, five boys from a nearby middle school vandalized the building, destroying drywall, throwing equipment into an orchestra pit, and pouring roofing glue on plumbing. The vandalism delayed the opening of the new wing by two weeks. Five years later, in 2003, the parking lots and gymnasium floor were replaced at a cost of roughly $1.3 million.

In early 2003, a group of conservative students began publishing an underground newspaper after they felt that the school newspaper was unresponsive to their needs. The underground paper courted controversy when it published stories arguing in favor of an immediate invasion of Iraq, against the desegregation program, and comparing abortion with the Holocaust. The abortion story also included "graphic photos of dismembered babies", and one student told the story's author that the photographs were "disgusting" because the paper was distributed during lunch. The newspaper was also published online. In 2007, a bomb threat resulted in canceled classes, while in 2008, vandalism led administrators to cancel the homecoming dance.

=== Recognitions and achievements ===
Summit was named by Newsweek magazine as one of America's top public high schools in 2006, 2008, 2010, and 2011.

Social studies teacher Jamie Manker was named "Missouri Teacher of the Year" for 2014.

The RSHS newspaper has received the George H. Gallup Award seven times.

The yearbook has received the National Scholastic Press Association All-American Award 11 times.

In 2015, the FCC awarded Summit an FM radio broadcasting license. The 89-watt educational radio station, KFTN 92.7, was awarded Best High School Radio Station in 2019 by the Intercollegiate Broadcasting System.

== Student body ==
As of the 2025–26 school year, Rockwood Summit had an enrollment of about 1,184 students. Nearly all students at Rockwood Summit High School matriculated from the feeder middle school, Rockwood South Middle School.

Student body composition (2025–26)
| Race and ethnicity | Total |
|---|---|
| White | 81.4% |
| Asian | 3.3% |
| Black | 7.9% |
| Hispanic | 3.3% |
| Multiracial | 4.1% |

Enrollment, racial demographics, and free or reduced-price lunches
| Year | Enrollment | White (%) | Black (%) | Asian (%) | Hispanic (%) | Free/reduced lunch (%) |
|---|---|---|---|---|---|---|
| 2018 | 1,298 | 80.1 | 10.1 | 4.2 | 3.0 | |
| 2011 | 1,321 | 85.9 | 11.1 | 1.7 | 0.9 | 17.3 |
| 2010 | 1,372 | 85.4 | 11.9 | 1.8 | 0.9 | 19.0 |
| 2009 | 1,368 | 85.9 | 12.1 | 1.4 | 0.6 | 16.3 |
| 2008 | 1,390 | 85.8 | 12.2 | 1.2 | 0.8 | 15.6 |
| 2007 | 1,394 | 86.2 | 12.4 | 0.9 | 0.5 | 12.5 |
| 2006 | 1,335 | 86.1 | 12.1 | 1.3 | 0.3 | 13.1 |
| 2005 | 1,342 | 85.2 | 13.0 | 1.3 | 0.3 | 12.8 |
| 2004 | 1,361 | 84.3 | 13.7 | 1.5 | 0.4 | 13.2 |
| 2003 | 1,363 | 83.3 | 14.7 | 1.3 | 0.6 | 13.7 |
| 2002 | 1,350 | 83.9 | 14.7 | 1.1 | 0.2 | 12.6 |

== Athletics and activities ==
For the 2018–2019 school year, the school offered 29 activities approved by the Missouri State High School Activities Association:

- Baseball
- Boys and girls basketball
- Robotics
- Cheerleading
- Boys and girls cross country
- Dance and pom-pom team
- Field hockey
- Football
- Boys and girls golf
- Girls lacrosse
- Band, orchestra, and vocal music
- Scholar bowl
- Step Team
- Boys and girls soccer
- Softball
- Speech and debate
- Boys and girls swimming and diving
- Boys and girls tennis
- Boys and girls track and field
- Boys and girls volleyball
- Water polo
- Winter guard
- Wrestling

Summit athletic teams have won 10 team state championships, including:

- Girls softball: 1998, 2006
- Dance team: 2011
- Boys baseball: 2012
- Cheerleading: 2015
- Boys soccer: 2016, 2019
- Boys track and field: 2017
- Girls soccer: 2018
- Girls lacrosse: 2019

The school has also produced individual state champions in track and field and wrestling.

== Notable alumni ==
- Josh Arnold, host on The Bob & Tom Show
- Sunil Bhave, judge of the Circuit Court of Cook County, Illinois
- Jackson Rutledge, pitcher selected 17th overall in the 2019 MLB draft by the Washington Nationals
- Brandon Williams, defensive tackle selected in the third round of the 2013 NFL draft
