= Wildwood, Missouri =

- City
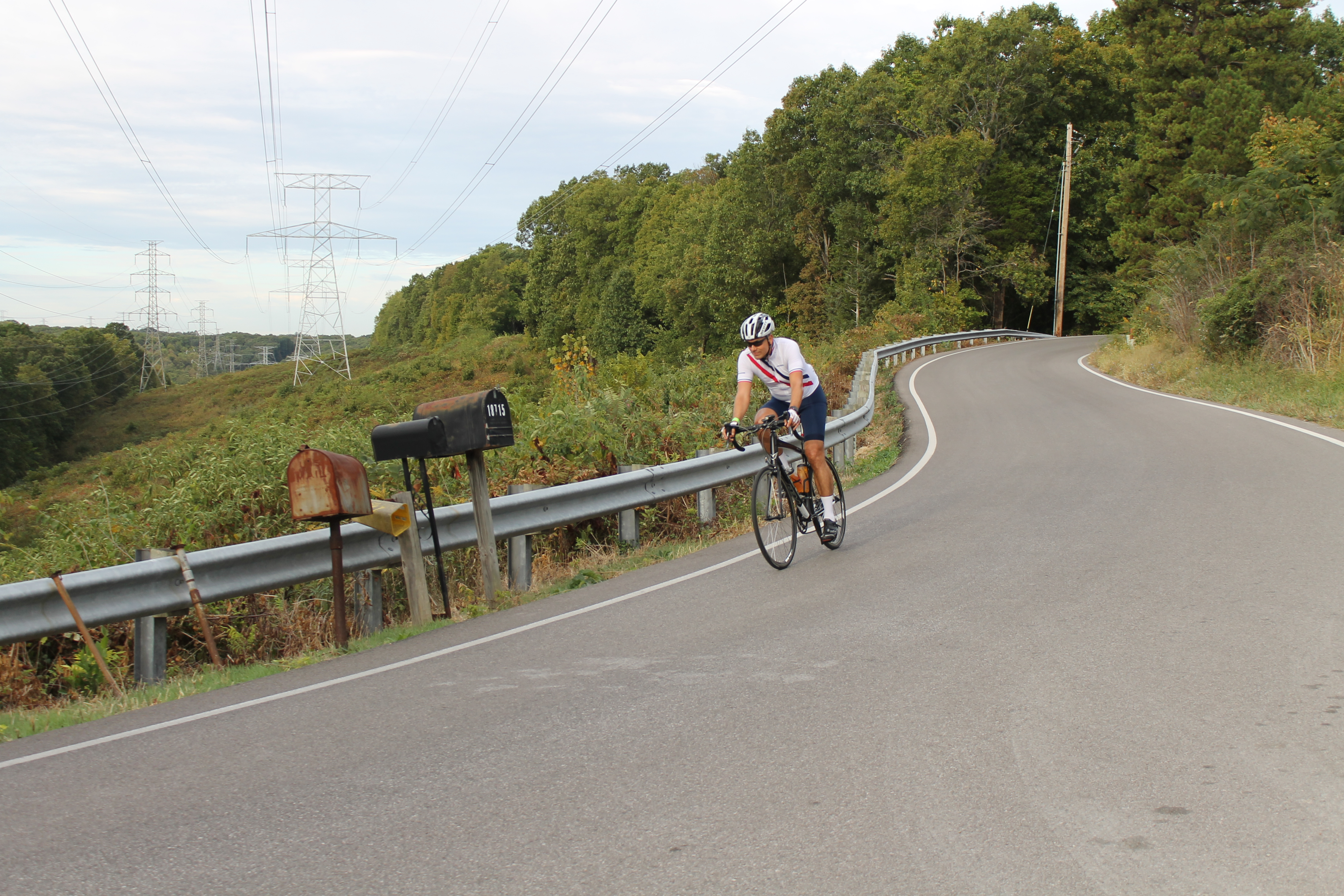
- Cyclist cruising downhill during 2017 Tour de Wildwood

- Motto: “Planning Tomorrow Today”
- Location of Wildwood, Missouri
- Coordinates: 38°34′48″N 90°40′11″W
- Country: United States
- State: Missouri
- County: St. Louis

Government
  - Mayor: Joe Garritano

Area
  - Total: 66.89 sq mi (173.25 km^{2})
  - Land: 66.68 sq mi (172.70 km^{2})
  - Water: 0.21 sq mi (0.55 km^{2})
- Elevation: 764 ft (233 m)

Population (2020)
  - Total: 35,417
  - Density: 531.1/sq mi (205.07/km^{2})
- Time zone: UTC−6 (Central (CST))
  - Summer (DST): UTC−5 (CDT)
- FIPS code: 29-79820
- GNIS feature ID: 2397311
- Website: www.cityofwildwood.com

Wildwood is a city in St. Louis County, Missouri, United States. It is located in the far western portion of the county. It was incorporated on September 1st, 1995.As of the 2020 census, the population was 35,417. Wildwood is the home of the Al Foster Trail, and numerous other trails, parks, and reserves such as Rockwoods Reservation and Babler State Park.

== Geography ==
According to the United States Census Bureau, the city has a total area of 67.08 square miles (173.74 km^{2}), of which 66.42 square miles (172.03 km^{2}) is land and 0.66 square miles (1.71 km^{2}) is water.

Wildwood is bounded to the north by Chesterfield; on the east by Clarkson Valley and Ellisville; to the south by Eureka and Pacific; and on the west by Franklin County.

== Demographics ==
Historical population
Census	Pop.	Note	%±
2000	32,884		—
2010	35,517		8.0%
2020	35,417		−0.3%
U.S. Decennial Census

=== Racial and ethnic composition ===
Wildwood city, Missouri – Racial and ethnic composition Note: the US Census treats Hispanic/Latino as an ethnic category. This table excludes Latinos from the racial categories and assigns them to a separate category. Hispanics/Latinos may be of any race.
Race / Ethnicity (NH = Non-Hispanic)	Pop 2000	Pop 2010	Pop 2020	% 2000	% 2010	% 2020
White alone (NH)	30,830	32,116	30,044	93.75%	90.42%	84.83%
Black or African American alone (NH)	524	581	549	1.59%	1.64%	1.55%
Native American or Alaska Native alone (NH)	36	47	40	0.11%	0.13%	0.11%
Asian alone (NH)	780	1,433	2,113	2.37%	4.03%	5.97%
Native Hawaiian or Pacific Islander alone (NH)	1	9	7	0.00%	0.03%	0.02%
Other race alone (NH)	34	23	110	0.10%	0.06%	0.31%
Mixed race or Multiracial (NH)	225	478	1,388	0.68%	1.35%	3.92%
Hispanic or Latino (any race)	454	830	1,166	1.38%	2.34%	3.29%
Total	32,884	35,517	35,417	100.00%	100.00%	100.00%

=== 2020 census ===
As of the 2020 census, Wildwood had a population of 35,417 and 10,730 families. The median age was 44.1 years; 24.3% of residents were under the age of 18 and 16.1% of residents were 65 years of age or older. For every 100 females there were 98.1 males, and for every 100 females age 18 and over there were 96.7 males age 18 and over. The population density was 531.1 inhabitants per square mile (205.1/km^{2}).

76.9% of residents lived in urban areas, while 23.1% lived in rural areas.

There were 12,481 households in Wildwood, of which 36.4% had children under the age of 18 living in them. Of all households, 73.4% were married-couple households, 8.9% were households with a male householder and no spouse or partner present, and 14.3% were households with a female householder and no spouse or partner present. About 14.4% of all households were made up of individuals and 6.8% had someone living alone who was 65 years of age or older.

There were 12,918 housing units, of which 3.4% were vacant. The homeowner vacancy rate was 1.1% and the rental vacancy rate was 5.7%.

Racial composition as of the 2020 census
Race	Number	Percent
White	30,314	85.6%
Black or African American	562	1.6%
American Indian and Alaska Native	52	0.1%
Asian	2,124	6.0%
Native Hawaiian and Other Pacific Islander	7	0.0%
Some other race	255	0.7%
Two or more races	2,103	5.9%
Hispanic or Latino (of any race)	1,166	3.3%

=== 2016–2020 American Community Survey ===
The 2016–2020 5-year American Community Survey estimates show that the median household income was $135,177 (with a margin of error of +/- $5,631) and the median family income was $146,996 (+/- $6,494). Males had a median income of $82,374 (+/- $6,540) versus $42,658 (+/- $3,708) for females. The median income for those above 16 years old was $61,906 (+/- $3,729). Approximately, 2.0% of families and 3.0% of the population were below the poverty line, including 2.7% of those under the age of 18 and 4.3% of those ages 65 or over.

=== 2010 census ===
At the 2010 census there were 35,517 people, 12,112 households, and 10,153 families living in the city. The population density was 534.7 inhabitants per square mile (206.4/km^{2}). There were 12,604 housing units at an average density of 189.8 per square mile (73.3/km^{2}). The racial makeup of the city was 87.2% White, 6.7% African American, 0.2% Native American, 4.0% Asian, 0.4% from other races, and 1.5% from two or more races. Hispanic or Latino of any race were 2.3%.

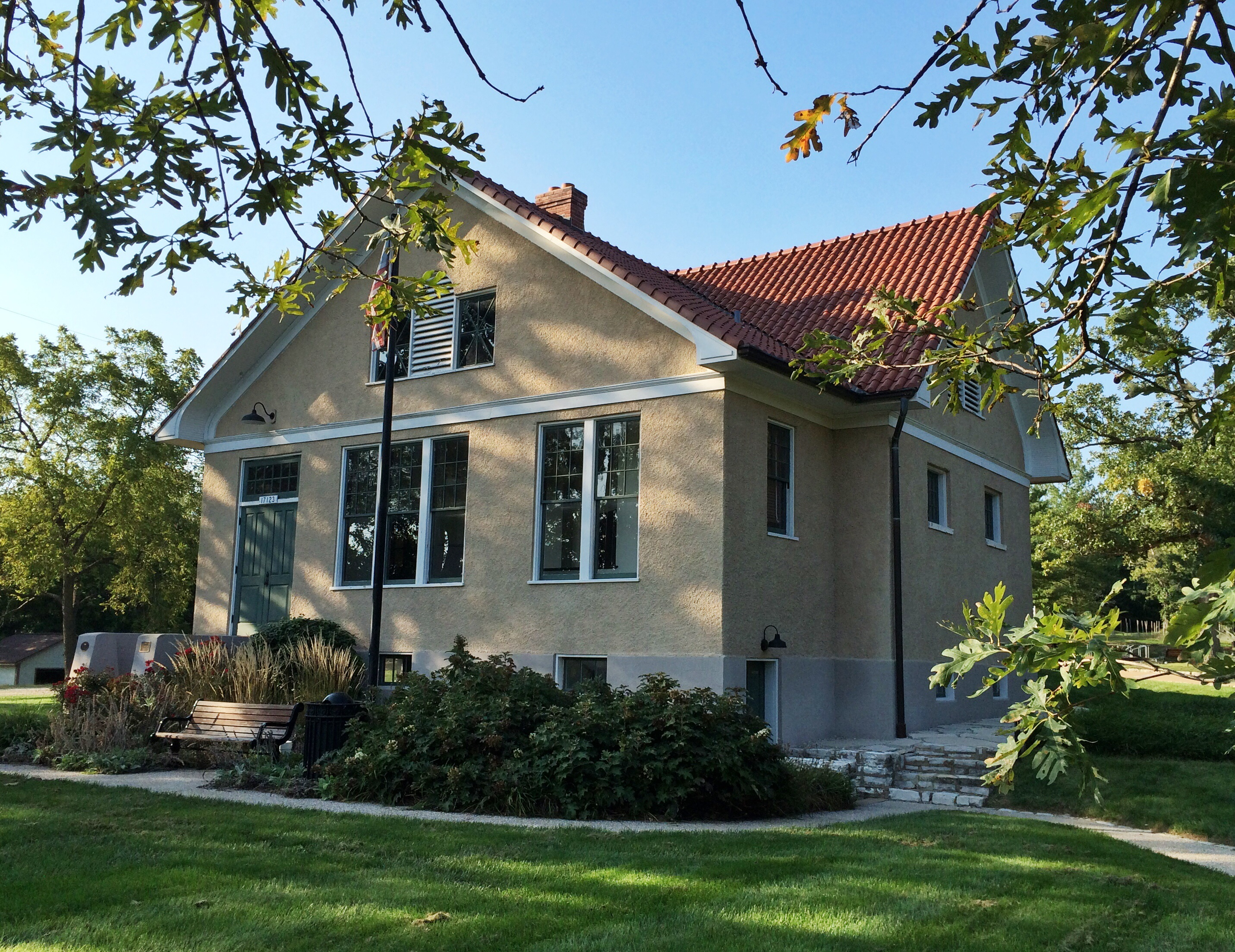
Pond School in Wildwood, MO

Of the 12,112 households 45.4% had children under the age of 18 living with them, 75.2% were married couples living together, 6.0% had a female householder with no husband present, 2.6% had a male householder with no wife present, and 16.2% were non-families. 13.6% of households were one person and 5% were one person aged 65 or older. The average household size was 2.93 and the average family size was 3.24.

The median age was 41.5 years. 30.3% of residents were under the age of 18; 5.9% were between the ages of 18 and 24; 20.3% were from 25 to 44; 34.8% were from 45 to 64; and 8.9% were 65 or older. The gender makeup of the city was 49.5% male and 50.5% female.

=== 2000 census ===
At the 2000 census there were 32,884 people, 10,837 households, and 9,243 families living in the city. The estimated median house/condo value in 2005 was $345,100. The population density was 498.0 inhabitants per square mile (192.3/km^{2}). There were 11,229 housing units at an average density of 170.1 per square mile (65.7/km^{2}). The racial makeup of the city was 94.74% White, 1.62% African American, 0.12% Native American, 2.38% Asian, 0.01% Pacific Islander, 0.29% from other races, and 0.83% from two or more races. Hispanic or Latino of any race were 1.38%.

Of the 10,837 households 51.0% had children under the age of 18 living with them, 79.0% were married couples living together, 4.6% had a female householder with no husband present, and 14.7% were non-families. 12.4% of households were one person and 4.0% were one person aged 65 or older. The average household size was 3.02 and the average family size was 3.32.

The age distribution was 33.2% under the age of 18, 4.8% from 18 to 24, 31.4% from 25 to 44, 25.1% from 45 to 64, and 5.5% 65 or older. The median age was 36 years. For every 100 females, there were 97.0 males. For every 100 females age 18 and over, there were 94.1 males.

Estimated median household income in 2007: $113,270. Males had a median income of $75,849 versus $41,224 for females. The per capita income for the city was $38,485. About 1.6% of families and 2.2% of the population were below the poverty line, including 2.1% of those under age 18 and 5.4% of those age 65 or over.

== Education ==
The vast majority of Wildwood is within the Rockwood School District, with one high school within the city limits, Lafayette High School.

A small portion is in the Meramec Valley School District.

St. Louis Community College–Wildwood is a local, two-year public community college located off Routes 100 and 109.

== Police ==
The City of Wildwood contracts for police service with the St. Louis County Police Department.

== Culture ==
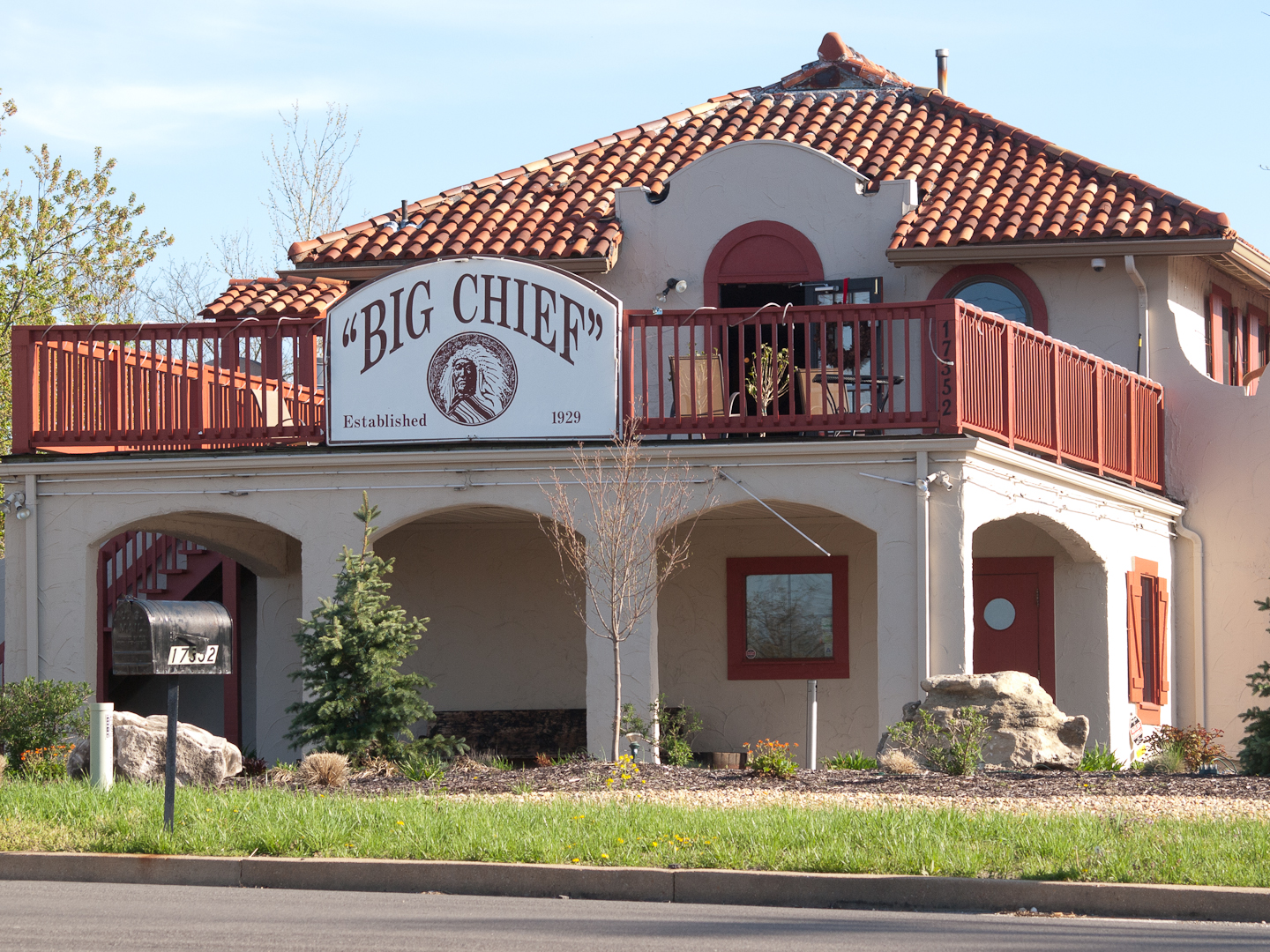
Big Chief Restaurant

The Big Chief Restaurant is all that remains of a tourist complex that opened on U.S. Route 66 in 1928. It was added to the National Register of Historic Places listings in 2003.

== Notable people ==
- David Freese, former third baseman for the St. Louis Cardinals, grew up in Wildwood.
- Ryan Howard, former first baseman for the Philadelphia Phillies, grew up in Wildwood.
- Albert Pujols of the St. Louis Cardinals lived in Wildwood briefly during a previous stint with the team.
- Jesse Smith, racing driver, born in Wildwood
- Kelly Stables, actress, grew up in Wildwood
- Niles Stephens, politician in Wildwood.
- Luke Voit, Major League Baseball player, grew up in Wildwood.
