= Creepyworld =

Theme park in Fenton, Missouri, United States

- Interactive map of Creepyworld
- Location: Fenton, Missouri, United States
- Coordinates: 38.4830°N 90.4414°W
- Opened: 1999
- Owner: Larry Kirchner
- Theme: Horror
- Operating season: Late September to Early November
- Website: https://www.creepyworld.com/

Creepyworld is a theme park located in Fenton, Missouri, United States. It opens annually around October, starting in 1999, and hosts many horror-themed and Halloween-themed attractions. Its owner, Larry Kirchner, owns various other horror-themed attractions in the St. Louis metropolitan area.

Several sources have named Creepyworld as the biggest "scream park" in the US and Greater St. Louis.

== Reception ==
Creepyworld has been frequently called one of the best horror-themed attractions in its city, state, and country, Fright Find called it one of the best haunted attractions in Missouri. Los Angeles Times listed Creepyworld on 4 for its list of 13 scariest destinations. 9news called it one of the scariest attractions in the US. Travel Channel called it America’s Scariest Haunted Houses in 2008.

== Attractions ==
Current attractions at Creepyworld (2026)
Attraction name	First opened	Source
Hayride	2009 or earlier	
Silo-X	2009 or earlier	
Saint Lucifer's Hospital	2014	
Blood Camp	2018	
Brigantine Asylum	2019	
Bobo Slaughterhouse	2023	
Fright High	2023	
Monster Mansion	2023	
Wendigo Revenge	2026	

Former attractions at Creepyworld
Attraction name	First opened	Last season	Source
Saw 3D	2011	2011	
