= Marquette High School (Missouri) =

Public secondary school in St. Louis County, Missouri, United States

Location
- 2351 Clarkson Road; Chesterfield, Missouri 63017; United States; 38°37′22″N 90°34′59″W

Information
- Type: Comprehensive high school
- Motto: We do whatever it takes to ensure all students realize their potential.
- Established: 1993; 33 years ago
- School district: Rockwood School District
- Head Principal: Tracey Waeckerle
- Teaching staff: 131.42 (on an FTE basis)
- Grades: 9–12
- Enrollment: 2,089 (2025–26)
- Student to teacher ratio: 15.94
- Colors: Navy, kelly green, and white
- Athletics conference: Suburban Conference
- Nickname: Mustangs
- Newspaper: Marquette Messenger
- Website: marquette.rsdmo.org

Marquette High School (MHS) is a comprehensive high school in Clarkson Valley, Missouri, part of Rockwood School District in St. Louis County. A majority of students matriculate from Crestview Middle School or Selvidge Middle School.

== Academics ==
Niche named Marquette High School as the #4 best public high school in the state of Missouri for 2026.

10 Marquette students were named as National Merit Semi-finalists for 2026.

7 current students have scored a 36 on the ACT.

Marquette students consistently score higher than the state average on standardized End-of-Course (EOC) exams, with 72% scoring proficient in reading and 62% scoring proficient in math.

== Student body ==
Marquette had a student body of 2,089 in 2025–26. The public school boundaries cover the eastern portion of Ellisville, Missouri, and almost the entirety of Ballwin, Clarkson Valley, and Chesterfield. While Marquette serves the smallest geographical area of the four district high schools, it has the largest student body due to population density.

Student body composition (2025–26)
Race and ethnicity	Total
White	63.2%
Asian	18.5%
Black	8.5%
Hispanic	6.2%
Multiracial	3.5%

== Teaching Staff ==
Marquette teachers have an average of 15 years experience, with 88% having advanced degrees. There are 18 National Board Certified teachers on staff.

== Athletics ==
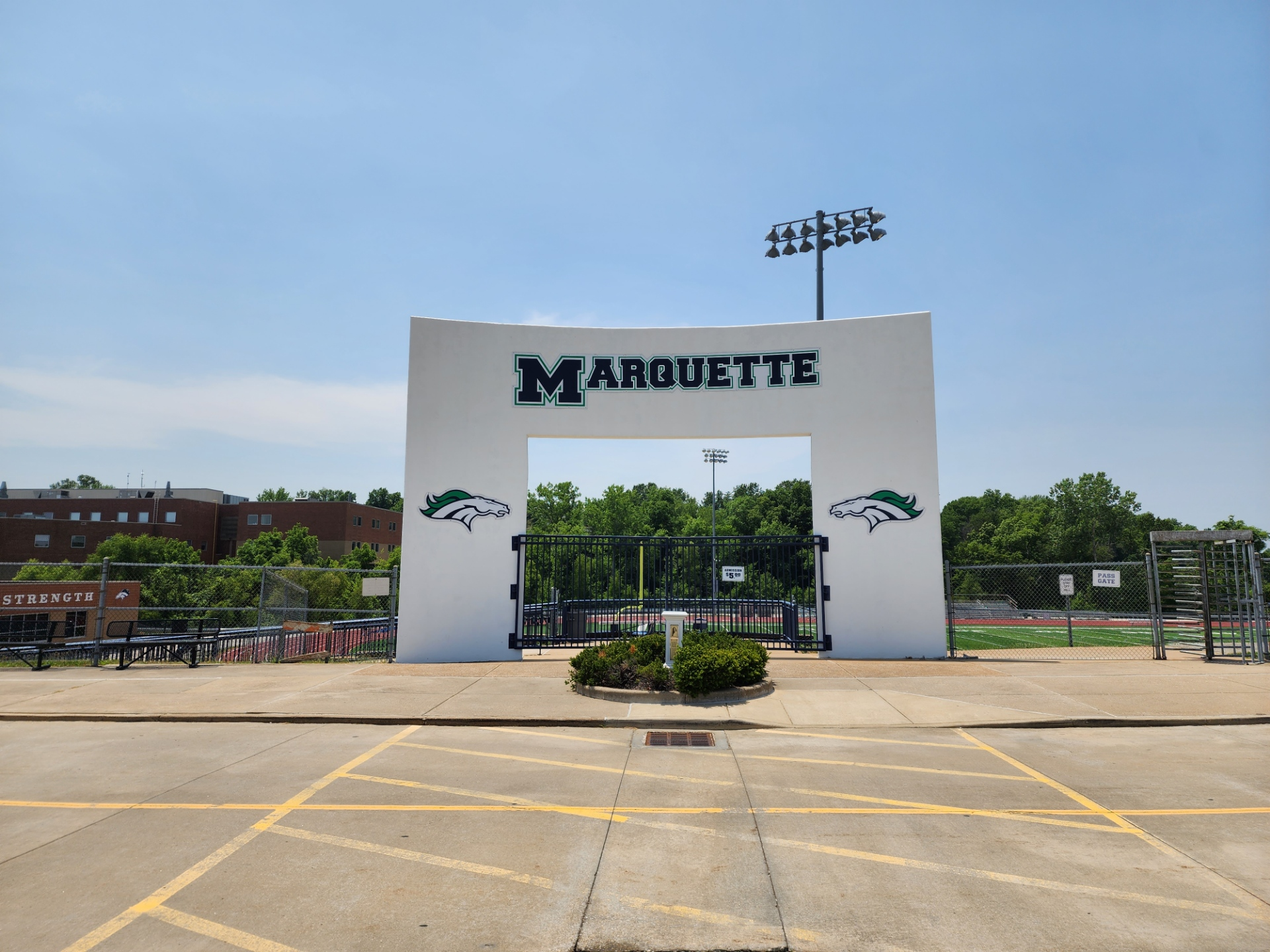
The entrance to the Marquette football field

Marquette's sports teams compete as the Mustangs. This mascot was selected among several options by incoming freshmen from Selvidge and Crestview Middle Schools for the high school's inaugural class. Marquette competes in the Suburban Conference, along with rivals Lafayette, Lindbergh, Fox, Northwest, Eureka, Parkway South, Mehlville, and Oakville.

According to the Missouri State High School Activities Association (MSHSAA), Marquette competes in the 6A class for football, basketball and baseball. Softball, golf, cross country, girls volleyball, and track & field compete in 5A; soccer, golf, and boys wrestling compete in 4A; tennis competes in 3A; and swimming, diving, girls wrestling, and boys volleyball compete in 2A.

Boys' teams include football, basketball, baseball, soccer, golf, wrestling, swim & dive, volleyball, cross country, and track and field, tennis. Club sports include ice hockey and lacrosse

Girls' teams include basketball, soccer, golf, wrestling, volleyball, softball, cross country, track and field, tennis, and field hockey

Each sport has varsity and junior varsity divisions, and a select few also have a freshman division (swimming and diving, wrestling, and football).

In 1998, the boys swimming and diving team won the Missouri State Championship

In 2015, the girls golf team won the Class 2 Missouri State Championship.

In 2017, the girls' varsity softball team won the Class 4 Missouri State Championship.

In 2019 and 2020, the girls swimming and diving team won the Class 2 Missouri State Championship.

== Extracurricular activities ==
MHS offers many activities, groups, and organizations in addition to its academics and sports teams. These include groups such as orchestra, band, choir, theatre, and debate.

The school's student newspaper is a monthly publication, The Marquette Messenger.

Marquette's Speech and Debate team has qualified students to MSHAA State, NFL Nationals, and NCFL Nationals. Students compete in a variety of debates and public speaking events. In 1999, Marquette student Ed Tulin won the Extemporaneous Speaking finals at NFL Nationals.

In 2022, Adriano Robins won best actor at the St. Louis High School Musical Awards for his performance as Emmett Forrest in Marquette's production of Legally Blonde the Musical. Robins represented St. Louis at the Jimmy Awards in New York City that summer.

== Notable alumni ==
- Joaquin Buckley, mixed martial artist
- Dan Connolly, former American football player
- Michael Johnson, The Ultimate Fighter 12 finalist and mixed martial artist
- Ben Keathley, politician
- Andrew Koenig, politician
- Larissa Meek, former beauty queen
- Nikolas Schiller, blogger
