= Maurice Alexander (safety) =

American football player (born 1991)

No. 31, 35, 41
- Position: Safety

Personal information
- Born: February 16, 1991 (age 35); St. Louis, Missouri, U.S.
- Listed height: 6 ft 2 in (1.88 m)
- Listed weight: 220 lb (100 kg)

Career information
- High school: Eureka (Eureka, Missouri)
- College: Arizona Western (2009–2010); Utah State (2011, 2013)
- NFL draft: 2014: 4th round, 110th overall pick

Career history
- St. Louis / Los Angeles Rams (2014–2017); Seattle Seahawks (2018); Buffalo Bills (2019)

Career NFL statistics
- Total tackles: 134
- Sacks: 3.0
- Fumble recoveries: 1
- Interceptions: 2
- Stats at Pro Football Reference

Maurice Alexander (born February 16, 1991) is an American former professional football player who was a linebacker and safety in the National Football League (NFL). He played college football at Arizona Western College before transferring to the Utah State Aggies. He was selected by the St. Louis Rams in the fourth round of the 2014 NFL draft.

== Early life ==
Alexander attended Eureka High School in Eureka, Missouri, where he was a three-sport athlete. In football, he was a two-time all-state football selection. He also participated in track and all-city wrestling, finishing third in the Missouri wrestling championships. He committed to Utah State to play college football.

== College career ==
Alexander attended Arizona Western College. In two seasons at Arizona Western, Alexander registered 179 tackles, 15 sacks, and four interceptions. He was a two-time all-conference selection in the Western States Football League and he was a first-team all-region honoree.

Though he had played defensive end since high school, Alexander switched to linebacker when he transferred to Utah State University. In early 2012, he got into a fight with a teammate after a party. The teammate, running back Joseph DeMartino, was knocked unconscious and required surgery for injuries to the face and eye. Alexander was dismissed from the team. Facing a year in jail, he entered a guilty plea to reduced charges, receiving a one-year sentence with all but 45 days of it suspended.

During his year away from college football, Alexander worked as a janitor at the Edward Jones Dome. He returned to the team in 2013, moving to safety. Utah State coach Matt Wells said, "In Maurice’s situation, he did everything from the legal standpoint and from the university standpoint, and internally, what we asked him to do. He fulfilled all those obligations and we've allowed him back in." Upon his return, Alexander said, "I'm starving. I'm starving to get out there, I'm starving to make plays. I want to make every play. I'm greedy right now." He started 13 games. He received All-Mountain West Conference honorable mention honors.

== Professional career ==
External videos
- Maurice Alexander's NFL Combine Workout

Pre-draft measurables
Height	Weight	Arm length	Hand span	Wingspan	40-yard dash	10-yard split	20-yard split	20-yard shuttle	Three-cone drill	Vertical jump	Broad jump
6 ft 1 1/4 in (1.86 m)	220 lb (100 kg)	32 5/8 in (0.83 m)	8 7/8 in (0.23 m)	6 ft 5 1/2 in (1.97 m)	4.54 s	1.56 s	2.66 s	4.24 s	7.05 s	38.0 in (0.97 m)	10 ft 3 in (3.12 m)
All values from NFL Combine/Pro Day

=== St. Louis / Los Angeles Rams ===
==== 2014 ====
The St. Louis Rams selected Alexander in the fourth round (110th overall) of the 2014 NFL draft. Alexander was the eighth safety drafted in 2014. Defensive coordinator Gregg Williams was cited as one of the top contributing factors in the selection of Alexander and claimed he would take awhile to develop, but would be comparable to Sean Taylor after doing so.

On June 23, 2014, the Rams signed Alexander to a four-year, $2.68 million contract that includes a signing bonus of $464,260.

Throughout training camp, Alexander competed for a job as a backup safety against Cody Davis, Christian Bryant, Lamarcus Joyner, and Matt Daniels. Head coach Jeff Fisher named him the backup strong safety to begin the regular season, behind T. J. McDonald.

He made his professional regular season debut in the Rams' Week 2 matchup at the Tampa Bay Buccaneers, but only appeared on special teams during their 19–17 victory. On November 16, 2014, Alexander recorded two solo tackles in the Rams' 22–7 win against the Denver Broncos in Week 11. He made his first career tackle on a ten-yard kick return by Andre Caldwell in the fourth quarter. He finished his rookie season with four solo tackles in nine games and zero starts while solely appearing on special teams.

==== 2015 ====
During training camp, Alexander competed against Mark Barron and Davis to be the Rams' primary backup strong safety. He was named the third string strong safety to begin the regular season.

On September 27, 2015, Alexander sustained a groin injury in the third quarter of a 12–6 loss to the Pittsburgh Steelers. He left the game due to the injury and was inactive for the next two games (Weeks 4–5). On November 8, 2015, Alexander earned his first career start after starter McDonald sustained a foot injury. He recorded three solo tackles and made his first career sack during their 21–18 overtime loss at the Minnesota Vikings. Alexander made his first career sack on quarterback Shaun Hill and dropped him for an 11-yard loss in the fourth quarter. On December 9, 2015, the Rams placed McDonald on injured reserve for the remainder of the season due to a shoulder injury and named Alexander his replacement at strong safety for the last four games. In Week 16, he collected a season-high eight combined tackles (four solo) during a 23–17 victory at the Seattle Seahawks. The following week, Alexander made a season-high seven solo tackles in the Rams' 19–16 loss at the San Francisco 49ers in Week 17. He finished the 2015 season with 39 combined tackles (30 solo), two sacks, a pass deflection, and a fumble recovery in 14 games and five starts.

==== 2016 ====
Alexander entered training camp in 2016 slated as a backup safety and competed for the starting free safety job after it was left vacant by the departure of Rodney McLeod. Williams held an open competition for the job between Alexander, Davis, and Bryant. Fisher named Alexander the starting free safety to begin the regular season, opposite strong safety McDonald.

On October 2, 2016, Alexander collected five combined tackles and a sack in their 17–13 victory at the Arizona Cardinals in Week 4. In Week 11, he made four combined tackles, broke up a pass, and made his first career interception during a 14–10 loss to the Miami Dolphins. Alexander intercepted a pass by Ryan Tannehill that was originally intended for DeVante Parker during the third quarter. On December 11, 2016, Alexander recorded four combined tackles before exiting the Rams' 42–14 loss to the Atlanta Falcons in Week 14 due to a possible concussion. The injury occurred when Alexander delivered a helmet-to-helmet hit on wide receiver Nick Williams after Williams' caught a ten-yard reception. The collision knocked Alexander unconscious and he was immediately carted off the field. Both players were diagnosed with concussions and Alexander was inactive for the next two games (Weeks 15–16). The following day, Los Angeles Rams' general manager Les Snead fired Fisher and named special teams coordinator John Fassel the interim head coach for the last three games of the regular season. Alexander finished his first season as a full-time starter with a career-high 50 combined tackles (38 solo), four pass deflections, two interceptions, and a sack in 14 games and 14 starts.

==== 2017 ====
Throughout training camp, Alexander competed against rookie John Johnson for the job as the starting strong safety. Head coach Sean McVay named him the starting strong safety to begin the season, along with free safety Lamarcus Joyner.

He started in the Los Angeles Rams season-opener against the Indianapolis Colts and recorded two combined tackles in their 46–9 victory. The following week, Alexander collected a season-high nine combined tackles during a 27–20 loss to the Washington Redskins in Week 4. Defensive coordinator Wade Phillips demoted Alexander in Week 5 and named rookie John Johnson the starter in his place. Alexander was listed inactive as a healthy scratch for the Rams' 16–10 loss to the Seahawks. On October 9, 2017, the Rams released Alexander after he struggled in the first four games of the season and earned the 73rd highest overall grade among 83 qualifying safeties from Pro Football Focus. When asked about Alexander's release, head coach Sean McVay stated, "We wish nothing but the best for Mo; I really enjoyed being around Mo, But I think it's a credit to the depth we've established at that safety position. There were some things where we expected a better level of play from him, and he knew that. Those things were communicated." He finished the 2017 season with 20 combined tackles (13 solo) in four games and four starts.

On October 16, 2017, Alexander attended a private visit with the Seahawks, but did not receive an offer at the time. It was also reported that Alexander attended a private workout with the New York Jets earlier in the week.

=== Seattle Seahawks ===
On March 17, 2018, the Seahawks signed Alexander to a one-year, $880,000 contract that includes a signing bonus of $50,000. He was released on September 1, 2018. He was re-signed on October 3, 2018.

=== Buffalo Bills ===
On March 22, 2019, Alexander signed with the Buffalo Bills as a linebacker. He was placed on injured reserve with knee and calf injuries.

== NFL career statistics ==
Legend
**Bold**	Career high

Year	Team	Games		Tackles					Interceptions					Fumbles			
Year	Team	GP	GS	Cmb	Solo	Ast	Sck	TFL	Int	Yds	TD	Lng	PD	FF	FR	Yds	TD
2014	STL	9	0	4	4	0	0.0	0	0	0	0	0	0	0	0	0	0
2015	STL	14	5	39	30	9	**2.0**	**4**	0	0	0	0	1	0	**1**	**3**	0
2016	LAR	14	14	**50**	**38**	**12**	1.0	1	**2**	**19**	0	**19**	**4**	0	0	0	0
2017	LAR	4	4	20	13	7	0.0	0	0	0	0	0	0	0	0	0	0
2018	SEA	9	0	10	9	1	0.0	0	0	0	0	0	0	0	0	0	0
2019	BUF	7	0	11	8	3	0.0	0	0	0	0	0	0	0	0	0	0
		57	23	134	102	32	3.0	5	2	19	0	19	5	0	1	3	0

== Personal life ==
Alexander’s younger brother, Hassan Haskins, is a running back for the Los Angeles Chargers.
