= Dan Connolly (American football) =

American football player (born 1982)

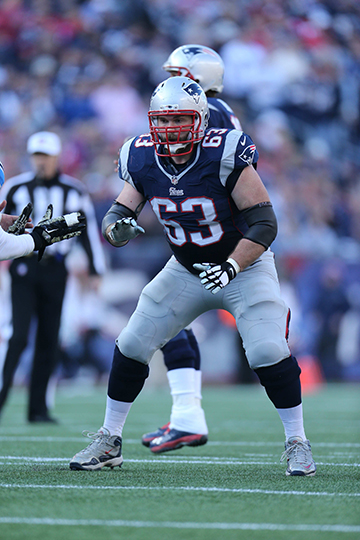
- Connolly with the New England Patriots in 2014

No. 61, 63
- Positions: Guard; Center

Personal information
- Born: September 2, 1982 (age 44); Chesterfield, Missouri, U.S.
- Listed height: 6 ft 4 in (1.93 m)
- Listed weight: 305 lb (138 kg)

Career information
- High school: Marquette (Chesterfield, Missouri)
- College: Southeast Missouri State
- NFL draft: 2005: undrafted

Career history
- Jacksonville Jaguars (2005–2006); New England Patriots (2007–2014)

Awards and highlights
- Super Bowl champion (XLIX); Madden Most Valuable Protectors Award (2010); 4× Second-team All-OVC (2001–2004)

Career NFL statistics
- Games played: 89
- Games started: 71
- Stats at Pro Football Reference

Daniel Paul Connolly (born September 2, 1982) is an American former professional football player. He was signed by the Jacksonville Jaguars as an undrafted free agent in 2005 after playing college football at Southeast Missouri State. Connolly played eight seasons for the New England Patriots, winning Super Bowl XLIX over the Seattle Seahawks in his final season.

== Early life ==
Connolly was born in Chesterfield, Missouri and attended Marquette High School in bordering Clarkson Valley, where he was a letterman in football and track. In football, he was a two-time All-District selection and a two-time All-Conference selection. In track and field, he threw the shot put.

== College career ==
He was a four-year starting offensive tackle for Southeast Missouri State, and was in All-Conference teams for four consecutive seasons, and finished his collegiate career with 46 consecutive starts.

== Professional career ==
Pre-draft measurables
| Height | Weight | Arm length | Hand span | 40-yard dash | 10-yard split | 20-yard split | 20-yard shuttle | Three-cone drill | Vertical jump | Broad jump | Bench press |
|---|---|---|---|---|---|---|---|---|---|---|---|
| 6 ft 3 5/8 in (1.92 m) | 311 lb (141 kg) | 32 1/4 in (0.82 m) | 9 1/4 in (0.23 m) | 5.23 s | 1.85 s | 3.04 s | 4.54 s | 7.65 s | 28.5 in (0.72 m) | 9 ft 0 in (2.74 m) | 22 reps |
All values from NFL Combine

=== Jacksonville Jaguars ===
Connolly was signed by the Jacksonville Jaguars as an undrafted free agent on April 24, 2005. He made the team's 53-man roster and spent the rest of the season on it. He was placed on injured reserve by the Jaguars on September 2, 2006. Connolly was waived by the Jaguars on September 1, 2007.

=== New England Patriots ===
Connolly was signed to the New England Patriots' practice squad on September 13, 2007, where he spent the remainder of the season before being re-signed to a future contract on February 5, 2008. He was then waived by the Patriots on October 20, 2008. He was re-signed to the team's practice squad on October 22. He was promoted to the active roster on December 13, 2008.

Connolly made the 53-man roster in 2009 and started four games at right guard in place of an injured Stephen Neal. During the season, he received a contract extension through the 2011 season.

With veteran starter Logan Mankins missing from the first seven games of the 2010 season due to a contract situation, Connolly started all of those games in his place at left guard. He was a reserve for the team's Week 9 game, but returned to the starting lineup at right guard following a season-ending injury to Neal.

In a December 19, 2010 game against the Green Bay Packers, Connolly set the record for the longest kickoff return by an offensive lineman in NFL history, returning a squib kick 71 yards to set up a Patriots touchdown (the previous record was 48 yards by Mal Snider in 1969). Connolly was named AFC Special Teams Player of the Week for the feat. Connolly suffered a concussion in the game and missed the final two games of the regular season. He finished the 2010 season with 13 starts in 14 games played.

At the end of the 2011 season, Connolly and the Patriots appeared in Super Bowl XLVI. He started in the game, but the Patriots lost to the New York Giants by a score of 21–17.

On September 3, 2014, Connolly was named one of the Patriots' six team captains. On February 1, 2015, he was part of the Patriots team that won Super Bowl XLIX over the Seattle Seahawks, 28–24.

=== Retirement ===
A free agent after the 2014 season, Connolly fielded interest from multiple NFL teams. However, on July 16, 2015, Connolly retired, citing family stability, concussion injuries and winning the Super Bowl as contributing factors.
