= Brandon Williams (defensive tackle) =

American football player (born 1989)

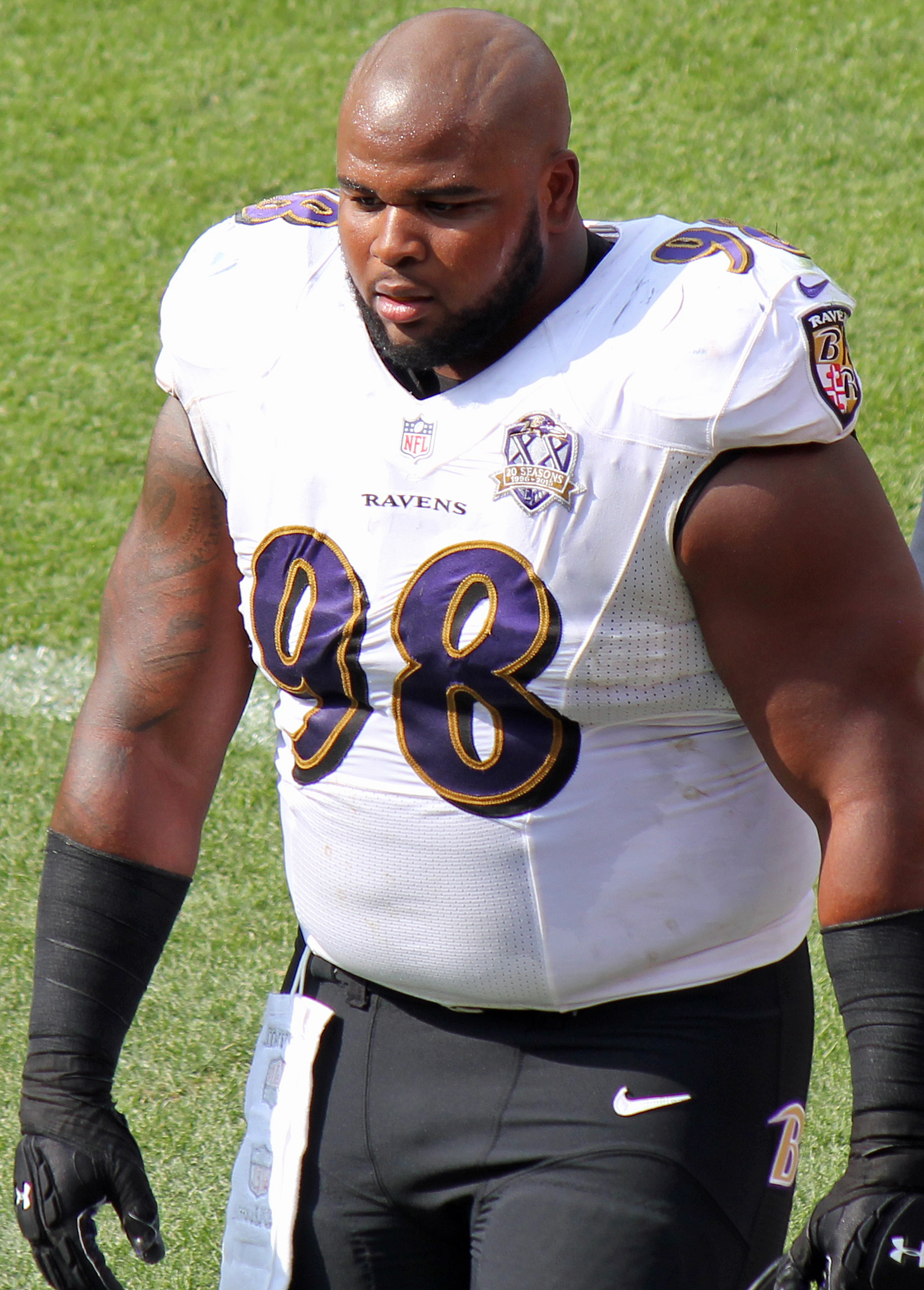
- Williams with the Baltimore Ravens in 2015

No. 98, 66
- Position: Defensive tackle

Personal information
- Born: February 21, 1989 (age 37); Kirkwood, Missouri, U.S.
- Listed height: 6 ft 1 in (1.85 m)
- Listed weight: 336 lb (152 kg)

Career information
- High school: Rockwood Summit (Fenton, Missouri)
- College: Missouri Southern (2008–2012)
- NFL draft: 2013: 3rd round, 94th overall pick

Career history
- Baltimore Ravens (2013–2021); Kansas City Chiefs (2022)

Awards and highlights
- Super Bowl champion (LVII); Pro Bowl (2018); MIAA Defensive Player of the Year (2012); First-team All-MIAA (2011, 2012)

Career NFL statistics
- Total tackles: 325
- Sacks: 7.0
- Forced fumbles: 2
- Fumble recoveries: 5
- Pass deflections: 11
- Defensive touchdowns: 1
- Stats at Pro Football Reference

Brandon James Williams (born February 21, 1989) is an American former professional football player who was a defensive tackle for nine seasons with the Baltimore Ravens and Kansas City Chiefs of the National Football League (NFL). He played college football for the Missouri Southern Lions and was selected by the Ravens in the third round of the 2013 NFL draft. Williams spent his first eight seasons with Baltimore before joining the Kansas City Chiefs in his last season, when they won Super Bowl LVII.

== Early life ==
Williams was born in Kirkwood, Missouri, on February 21, 1989. He attended Stanton Elementary, Rockwood South Middle School (where he took 3 years of vocal music classes with Ms. Lora Springer (Pemberton), and Rockwood Summit High School in Fenton, Missouri, and played high school football for the Rockwood Summit Falcons. He was an all-conference and all-state selection for Rockwood Summit at defensive tackle, and led the Falcons with 99 tackles and seven sacks in 2006. He was also a team captain and was recognized as the Suburban South Defensive Player of the Year. He transferred to Harmony Prep School in Cincinnati, Ohio, for his senior year.

== College career ==
Williams attended Missouri Southern State University, where he played for the Missouri Southern State Lions football team from 2008 to 2012. He was a major contributor as a freshman finishing eighth on the team in tackles with 38, including three for loss and 1.5 sacks. After a medical redshirt in 2009 due to a back injury, he returned the following year in 2010 and led the Lions with nine sacks and 17.5 tackles for loss and was named to three-different All-American teams. As a junior in 2011, he was a unanimous All-Mid-America Intercollegiate Athletics Association (MIAA) selection after finishing the season third in the MIAA in sacks with eight, while ranking second in the conference in tackles for loss with 16. In 2012, as a senior, he was named the MIAA Defensive Player of the Year. Williams became the all-time sacks leader for the school and finished with 27 in his career. He finished the season second on the team with 68 tackles, 31 solo, including 16.5 for a loss. He had 8.5 sacks, two pass break ups, eight quarterback hurries, five forced fumbles, and one safety on the season and finished third in the MIAA in sacks and tackles for a loss, while ranking second in forced fumbles.

== Professional career ==
Pre-draft measurables
| Height | Weight | Arm length | Hand span | Wingspan | 40-yard dash | 10-yard split | 20-yard split | 20-yard shuttle | Three-cone drill | Vertical jump | Broad jump | Bench press |
|---|---|---|---|---|---|---|---|---|---|---|---|---|
| 6 ft 1 1/4 in (1.86 m) | 335 lb (152 kg) | 32 5/8 in (0.83 m) | 9 3/4 in (0.25 m) | 6 ft 7 7/8 in (2.03 m) | 5.37 s | 1.86 s | 3.09 s | 4.91 s | 8.09 s | 29.5 in (0.75 m) | 8 ft 6 in (2.59 m) | 38 reps |
All values from NFL Combine

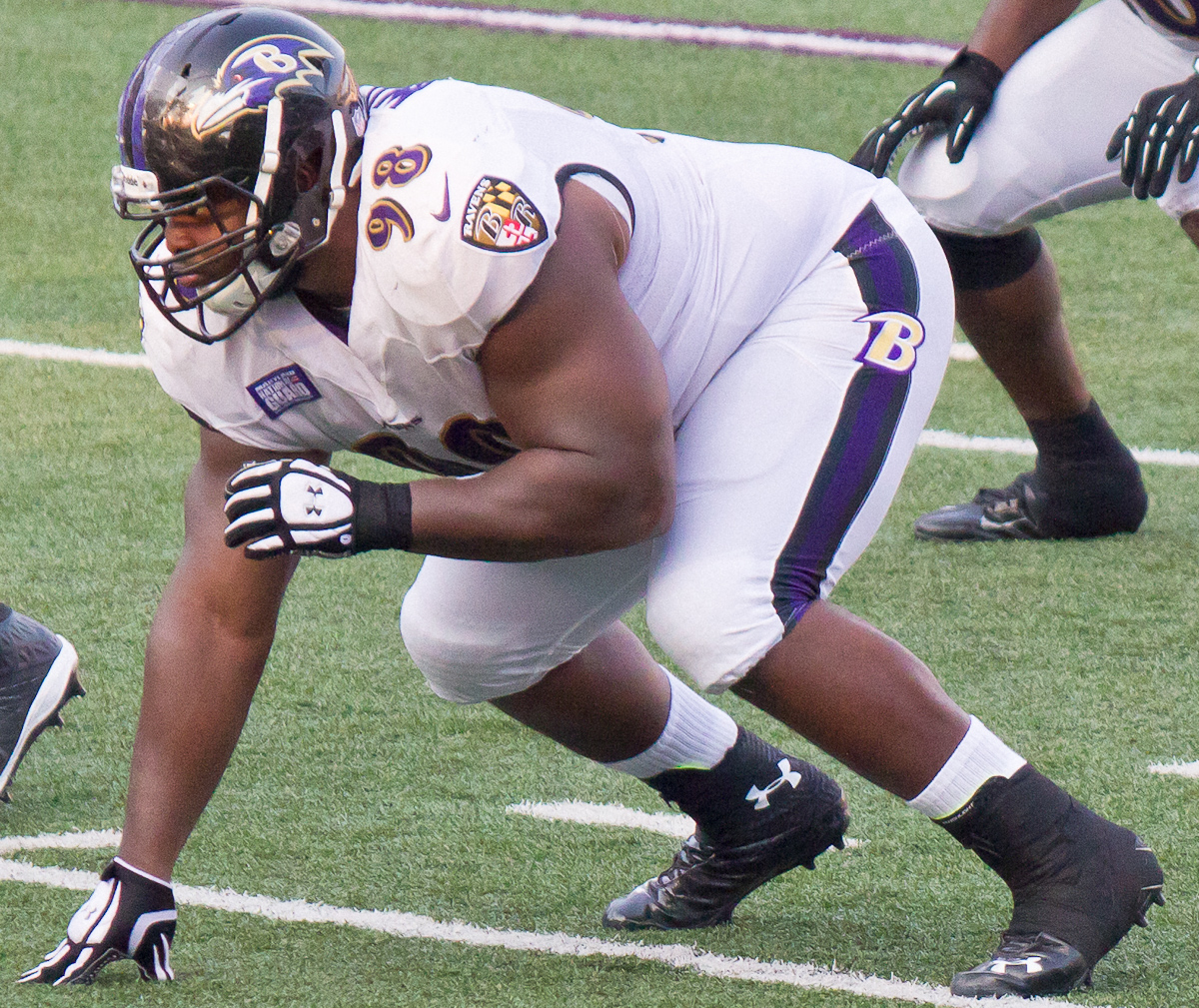
Williams playing for the Ravens in his rookie season in 2013

=== Baltimore Ravens ===
Williams was selected by the Baltimore Ravens in the third round, with the 94th overall pick, of the 2013 NFL draft. Williams became the first Missouri Southern State player to be drafted since Allen Barbre was selected by the Green Bay Packers in 2007. Williams made his NFL debut on September 29, 2013, recording a fumble recovery and logging 20 snaps against the Buffalo Bills. The next week he recorded his first tackle & tackle for loss against the Miami Dolphins. He would record his first career sack against the Pittsburgh Steelers. Williams played in seven games with six tackles, two tackles for loss, one sack, and one fumble recovery.

Williams made his first-career start against the Cincinnati Bengals in the 2014 season opener, recording two tackles. On September 28, 2014, Williams recorded his first-career forced fumble against the Carolina Panthers, stripping running back Tauren Poole and recovering the fumble afterward. On October 26, he recorded a season-high 6 tackles against the Cincinnati Bengals. Williams played all 16 games starting 14 of them with 54 tackles a half-sack, 1 forced fumble, and a fumble recovery. On January 3, 2015, Williams made his playoff debut against the Pittsburgh Steelers in the AFC Wild Card round, logging a sack, 6 tackles, and a tackle for loss.

In Week 2, Williams recorded his first-career pass breakup against the Oakland Raiders. In Week 3, he registered a career-highs in tackles and tackles (8) for loss (2) against the Cincinnati Bengals. In Week 5, he made his second-career sack against the Cleveland Browns. In Week 10, Williams documented his third-career sack against the Jacksonville Jaguars. In Week 11, he recorded his second-career forced fumble against the St. Louis Rams. Williams started all 16 games with 53 tackles, 9 tackles for loss, 2 sacks, 4 quarterback hits, 2 passes defended, and a forced fumble.

In Week 7, Williams recorded his fourth sack and blocked a field goal against the New York Jets. In 2016, he again started all 16 games with 51 tackles, 4 tackles for loss, a sack, 2 quarterback hits, and a pass defended.

On March 9, 2017, Williams signed a five-year, $54 million contract extension with the Ravens. In Week 8, Williams recorded a career-high three tackles for loss against the Miami Dolphins. In Week 15, Williams scored his first touchdown off of a fumble recovery against the Cleveland Browns. He started 12 games for the Ravens with 30 tackles, 5 tackles for loss, 2 quarterback hits, 2 passes deflected, a fumble recovery & a touchdown.

In Week 5 of the 2018 season, Williams recorded his fifth sack against the Cleveland Browns. In 2018, Williams started all 16 games, recording 34 tackles and one sack, on his way to his first Pro Bowl.

Williams was placed on the reserve/COVID-19 list by the Ravens on October 17, 2020, and was activated on October 22, 2020. He was placed back on the COVID-19 list on November 23, 2020, and activated on December 1, 2020.

=== Kansas City Chiefs ===
On November 30, 2022, the Kansas City Chiefs signed Williams to their practice squad. He was promoted to the active roster on December 8, 2022. Williams won his first Super Bowl ring when the Chiefs defeated the Philadelphia Eagles in Super Bowl LVII.

On November 5, 2024, Williams officially retired from professional football as a Raven.

== NFL career statistics ==
Legend
| **Bold** | Career high |

=== Regular season ===
| Year | Team | Games | | Tackles | | | | | Interceptions | | | | | Fumbles | | | |
| Year | Team | GP | GS | Cmb | Solo | Ast | Sck | TFL | Int | Yds | TD | Lng | PD | FF | FR | Yds | TD |
|---|---|---|---|---|---|---|---|---|---|---|---|---|---|---|---|---|---|
| 2013 | BAL | 7 | 0 | 6 | 3 | 3 | 1.0 | 2 | 0 | 0 | 0 | 0 | 0 | 0 | **1** | 0 | 0 |
| 2014 | BAL | **16** | 14 | 47 | 25 | **22** | 0.5 | 2 | 0 | 0 | 0 | 0 | 0 | **1** | **1** | 0 | 0 |
| 2015 | BAL | **16** | **16** | **53** | **35** | 18 | **2.0** | **9** | 0 | 0 | 0 | 0 | 2 | **1** | 0 | 0 | 0 |
| 2016 | BAL | **16** | **16** | 51 | 34 | 17 | 1.0 | 4 | 0 | 0 | 0 | 0 | 1 | 0 | 0 | 0 | 0 |
| 2017 | BAL | 12 | 12 | 30 | 18 | 12 | 0.0 | 5 | 0 | 0 | 0 | 0 | 2 | 0 | **1** | **1** | **1** |
| 2018 | BAL | **16** | **16** | 34 | 21 | 13 | 1.0 | 3 | 0 | 0 | 0 | 0 | 1 | 0 | 0 | 0 | 0 |
| 2019 | BAL | 14 | 14 | 34 | 13 | 21 | 1.0 | 2 | 0 | 0 | 0 | 0 | 0 | 0 | **1** | 0 | 0 |
| 2020 | BAL | 13 | 13 | 33 | 19 | 14 | 0.0 | 2 | 0 | 0 | 0 | 0 | 2 | 0 | 0 | 0 | 0 |
| 2021 | BAL | 13 | 13 | 35 | 15 | 20 | 0.0 | 4 | 0 | 0 | 0 | 0 | **3** | 0 | **1** | 0 | 0 |
| 2022 | KC | 5 | 0 | 2 | 1 | 1 | 0.5 | 1 | 0 | 0 | 0 | 0 | 0 | 0 | 0 | 0 | 0 |
| Career | | 128 | 114 | 325 | 184 | 141 | 7.0 | 34 | 0 | 0 | 0 | 0 | 11 | 2 | 5 | 1 | 1 |

=== Playoffs ===
| Year | Team | Games | | Tackles | | | | | Interceptions | | | | | Fumbles | | | |
| Year | Team | GP | GS | Cmb | Solo | Ast | Sck | TFL | Int | Yds | TD | Lng | PD | FF | FR | Yds | TD |
|---|---|---|---|---|---|---|---|---|---|---|---|---|---|---|---|---|---|
| 2014 | BAL | 2 | **2** | **7** | **5** | 2 | **1.0** | **2** | 0 | 0 | 0 | 0 | 0 | 0 | 0 | 0 | 0 |
| 2018 | BAL | 1 | 1 | 2 | 1 | 1 | 0.0 | 0 | 0 | 0 | 0 | 0 | 0 | 0 | 0 | 0 | 0 |
| 2019 | BAL | 1 | 1 | 6 | **5** | 1 | 0.0 | 1 | 0 | 0 | 0 | 0 | 0 | 0 | 0 | 0 | 0 |
| 2020 | BAL | 2 | **2** | 6 | 3 | **3** | 0.0 | 0 | 0 | 0 | 0 | 0 | 0 | 0 | 0 | 0 | 0 |
| 2022 | KC | **3** | 0 | 0 | 0 | 0 | 0.0 | 0 | 0 | 0 | 0 | 0 | 0 | 0 | 0 | 0 | 0 |
| Career | | 9 | 6 | 21 | 14 | 7 | 1.0 | 3 | 0 | 0 | 0 | 0 | 0 | 0 | 0 | 0 | 0 |
