= Sachs Electric =

Archkey Solutions
- Type: Private equity-owned
- Industry: Electrical contracting
- Founded: 1925
- Founder: Samuel Sachs
- Headquarters: Fenton, Missouri
- Key people: Steve Stone
- Revenue: $264 million
- Owner: One Rock Capital
- Subsidiaries: Archkey Solutions; Parsons Electric; Sprig Electric; Mona Electric
- Website: Sachs Electric

Archkey Solutions is the largest electrical contractor in Missouri. In addition, Sachs has four specialized divisions: Sachs Automation, for pneumatic and computer-based process control systems; Sachs Systems for communications and security systems; McGraw Electric (in Livonia, Michigan) for automotive industry and other industrial electrical contracting; and Sachs Civil, for in-house support for trenching, excavating and general trades.

The company is based in Fenton, Missouri, a suburb of St. Louis. It was founded as S&S Electric Company, a two-man and one-room company in 1925, by Samuel Sachs in partnership with fellow Washington University in St. Louis graduate Herman Spoehrer. It was renamed S. C. Sachs Company in the early 1930s. Early projects included designing and building the lighting for Sportsman's Park, home of the St. Louis Browns baseball team. Samuel Sachs was chief executive until 1953, when his son Louis Sachs was promoted to president. Louis Sachs was succeeded as president by Norman Krause in 1973 and Larry Plunkett in 1983, though the company remained family owned through 1990. In 1990, Plunkett, as president and CEO, oversaw his most ambitious project, the employee buyout of the company from the Sachs family with a five-year loan that the company paid off in three and a half years. In 2000, the CEO position went to Robert Murdick and the presidency to Clayton Scharff, and Scharff replaced Murdick as CEO in 2002.

Sachs acquired Detroit-based McGraw Electric in 2003, to expand into the Michigan industrial and automotive sector.

Company revenue grew from $17 million in 1969, when Plunkett joined the company as an engineer under the tutelage of Norman Krause, to $100 million in 1995, $220 million in 2001, and $293 million in 2007.
