= Jackson Rutledge =

American baseball player (born 1999)

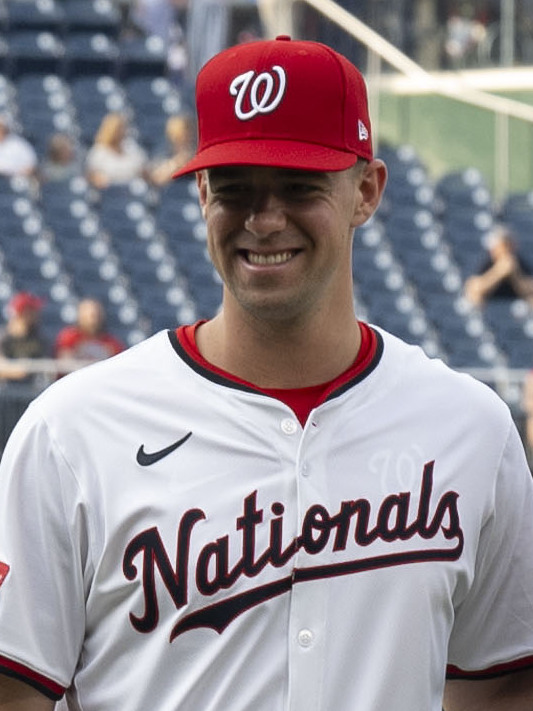
- Rutledge with the Washington Nationals in 2025

Free agent
- Pitcher
- Born: April 1, 1999 (age 27); Fenton, Missouri, U.S.
- Bats: Right Throws: Right

Professional debut
- MLB: September 13, 2023, for the Washington Nationals
- NPB: September 12, 2026, for the Fukuoka SoftBank Hawks

MLB statistics (through 2026 season)
- Win–loss record: 5–3
- Earned run average: 6.29
- Strikeouts: 88

NPB statistics (through 2026 season)
- Win–loss record: 1-0
- Earned run average: 1.35
- Strikeouts: 5
- Stats at Baseball Reference

Teams
- Washington Nationals (2023–2026); Fukuoka SoftBank Hawks (2026)

Career highlights and awards
- Japan Series champion (2026)

Jackson Christian Rutledge (born April 1, 1999) is an American professional baseball pitcher who is a free agent. He has previously played in Major League Baseball (MLB) for the Washington Nationals and in Nippon Professional Baseball (NPB) for the Fukuoka SoftBank Hawks.

== Amateur career ==
Rutledge attended Rockwood Summit High School in Fenton, Missouri. In 2017, as a senior, he went 7-1 with a 1.19 ERA. He went undrafted in the 2017 Major League Baseball draft and enrolled at the University of Arkansas to play college baseball for the Arkansas Razorbacks.

As a freshman at Arkansas in 2018, Rutledge appeared in 12 games in which he went 3-0 with a 3.45 ERA. He began the year as a key pitcher out of the bullpen, but struggled in Southeastern Conference play, compiling a 27.00 ERA in three games, and did not pitch at all during the month of May. He announced that month that he would transfer and spend the 2019 season at San Jacinto College. During the 2018 offseason, he committed to play his 2020 junior season at the University of Kentucky. Rutledge broke out as a sophomore for the San Jacinto Central Ravens in 2019, pitching to a 9-2 record with a 0.87 ERA in 13 games, striking out 134 in 82 2/3 innings.

== Professional career ==
=== Washington Nationals ===
Rutledge was considered one of the top prospects for the 2019 Major League Baseball draft. He was selected by the Washington Nationals with the 17th overall pick. He agreed to terms with the Nationals on June 17 for $3.45 million. He made his professional debut with the Rookie-level Gulf Coast League Nationals before being promoted to the Auburn Doubledays of the Low–A New York–Penn League after one game. He was promoted to the Hagerstown Suns of the Single–A South Atlantic League in July, with whom he finished the year. Over ten starts between the three clubs, he went 2-0 with a 3.13 ERA, striking out 39 over 37 1/3 innings. Rutledge did not play in a game in 2020 due to the cancellation of the minor league season because of the COVID-19 pandemic.

To begin the 2021 season, he was assigned to the Wilmington Blue Rocks of the High-A East. After pitching 10 2/3 innings, in which he gave up 15 earned runs and 17 hits, he was placed on the injured list with a shoulder injury. He was activated in July, and reassigned to the Fredericksburg Nationals of the Low-A East. He was placed back on the injured list in early August, and returned later that month. Over 22 innings pitched with Fredericksburg, Rutledge went 1-2 with a 5.32 ERA and 26 strikeouts. He was selected to play in the Arizona Fall League for the Surprise Saguaros after the season. Rutledge pitched 3⅓ innings in relief for the Saguaros in the championship game on November 20, 2021, versus the Mesa Solar Sox, giving up two runs but striking out seven. MLB Pipeline rated him as Surprise's top performer in the game, a 6–0 Mesa win. He returned to Fredericksburg to open the 2022 season. In 20 starts for Fredericksburg, he recorded a 8–6 record and 4.90 ERA with 99 strikeouts in 97 1/3 innings pitched.

On November 15, 2022, the Nationals added Rutledge to their 40-man roster to protect him from the Rule 5 draft. He was optioned to the Double-A Harrisburg Senators to begin the 2023 season. In 23 starts split between Harrisburg and the Triple–A Rochester Red Wings, he accumulated an 8–4 record and 3.71 ERA with 106 strikeouts in 119 innings of work. On September 13, 2023, Rutledge was promoted to the major leagues for the first time. He faced the Pittsburgh Pirates in his major league debut that same day, and took the loss. Rutledge recorded his first career win against the Atlanta Braves on September 24. In 4 starts during his rookie campaign, he posted a 6.75 ERA with 12 strikeouts across 20 innings.

Rutledge was optioned to Triple–A Rochester to begin the 2024 season. He made 3 appearances (1 start) for Washington in 2024, logging a 3.24 ERA with 9 strikeouts across 8 1/3 innings pitched. Rutledge was again optioned to Triple-A Rochester to begin the 2025 season. He went on to make 63 relief appearances for the Nationals, compiling a 4-2 record and 5.77 ERA with 65 strikeouts across 73 1/3 innings pitched.

Rutledge was optioned to Triple-A Rochester to begin the 2026 season. He made one appearance for Washington on April 13, 2026, allowing seven runs on six hits with two strikeouts over 1 1/3 innings pitched against the Pittsburgh Pirates. On May 6, Rutledge was designated for assignment by the Nationals.

=== Philadelphia Phillies ===
On May 10, 2026, Rutledge was claimed off of waivers by the Philadelphia Phillies. He made five appearances for the Triple-A Lehigh Valley IronPigs, struggling to a 7.20 ERA with three strikeouts over five innings of work. Rutledge was designated for assignment by the Phillies on June 11. He was released by Philadelphia after clearing waivers on June 16. On June 23, Rutledge re-signed with the Phillies on a new minor league contract. He was released for the second time on July 23.

=== Fukuoka SoftBank Hawks ===
On August 13, 2026, Rutledge signed with the Fukuoka SoftBank Hawks of the Nippon Professional Baseball. He made his NPB debut in a game against the Chiba Lotte Marines on September 12, pitching five innings and earning the win. with Fukuoka he won the 2026 Japan Series. He became a free agent following the season.

== Pitching style ==
Rutledge stands 6 feet 8 inches (2.03 m), taller than the average pitcher, although his arm action is relatively short and compact. He throws a four-seam fastball that has been clocked as fast as 99 miles per hour (159 km/h), complementing it with a slider, a changeup, and a curveball. Rutledge introduced the slider during his 2019 season with San Jacinto after tweaking his grip to differentiate it from his curveball. He has credited Ross Detwiler, also a first-round selection of the Washington Nationals in the 2007 MLB draft, for helping him develop his changeup.
