= Hassan Haskins =

American football player (born 1999)

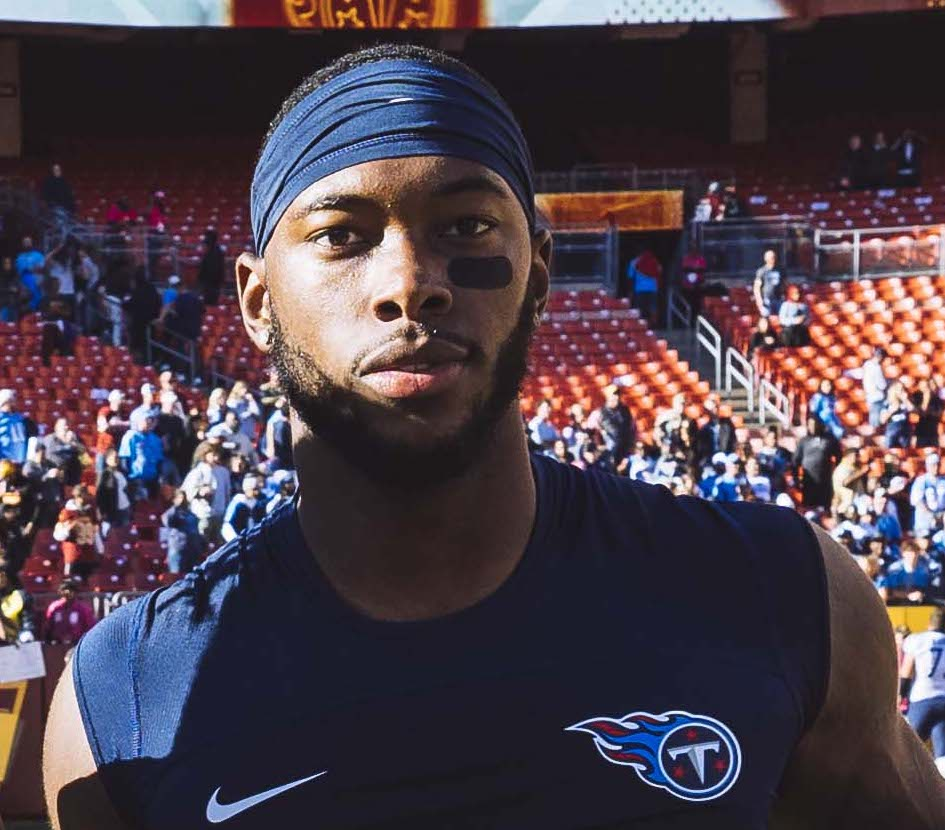
- Haskins with the Tennessee Titans in 2022

No. 27 – Cleveland Browns
- Positions: Running back, kickoff returner
- Roster status: Practice squad

Personal information
- Born: November 26, 1999 (age 26); St. Louis, Missouri, U.S.
- Listed height: 6 ft 2 in (1.88 m)
- Listed weight: 228 lb (103 kg)

Career information
- High school: Eureka (Eureka, Missouri)
- College: Michigan (2018–2021)
- NFL draft: 2022: 4th round, 131st overall pick

Career history
- Tennessee Titans (2022–2023); Los Angeles Chargers (2024–2025); New England Patriots (2026)*; Cleveland Browns (2026–present)*
- * Offseason or practice squad member only

Awards and highlights
- Second-team All-American (2021); First-team All-Big Ten (2021)

Career NFL statistics as of 2025
- Rushing yards: 229
- Rushing average: 3.0
- Rushing touchdowns: 2
- Receptions: 18
- Receiving yards: 119
- Receiving touchdowns: 1
- Return yards: 646
- Stats at Pro Football Reference

Hassan Askiali Haskins Jr. (born November 26, 1999) is an American professional football running back for the Cleveland Browns of the National Football League (NFL). He was an All-American for the Michigan Wolverines, and was selected by the Tennessee Titans in the fourth round of the 2022 NFL draft.

== Early life ==
In addition to playing football at Eureka High School in Eureka, Missouri, Haskins participated in basketball and track and field. Haskins placed second in the high jump at the 2017 MSHSAA Class 5 State Championship, clearing 6' 7". As a senior, he led the basketball team in blocks and steals while averaging 8.1 points per game. As a junior on the football team, Haskins had 242 carries, 1,509 yards, and 19 rushing touchdowns to go along with 2 receiving touchdowns and one passing touchdown. He added 12 sacks and a fumble recovery as a defensive end. As a senior, he had 255 carries, 2,197 yards, and 31 rushing touchdowns with 2 receiving touchdowns. He also contributed on defense with 9 sacks and two fumble recoveries, one of which he returned for a 50-yard touchdown.

Haskins was lightly recruited by Power Five football programs. He ran a 4.74 second 40-yard dash in high school, and his speed could be a reason for his under-rating. Said Haskins' high school assistant coach Tyler Wasson, "There was a 1-AA team that would e-mail us, 'Well, he doesn't fit our system. He's not fast enough.'" When Michigan was recruiting Haskins, he was the nation's 82nd best running back and well outside the top 1,000 recruits in the class. Haskins committed to Michigan on October 29, 2017, as a three-star running back. He ended the recruitment cycle as the no. 975 overall recruit after he signed with Michigan.

== College career ==
In his redshirt freshman year, Haskins agreed to move to defense to play linebacker. In 2019, with the graduation of Karan Higdon and the suspension of Chris Evans, Haskins moved back to running back to improve the depth at the position. Haskins had his breakout game on October 12, 2019, when he carried 12 times for 125 yards with his first collegiate touchdown against Illinois. In his first collegiate start on October 26, 2019, against Notre Dame, Haskins had 20 carries for 149 yards, including a 49-yard long rush. He finished the 2019 season with 121 carries for 622 yards and four touchdowns. Haskins claimed that spending time at linebacker gave him a better vision of the running lanes and helped him see what opposing defenses were trying to do.

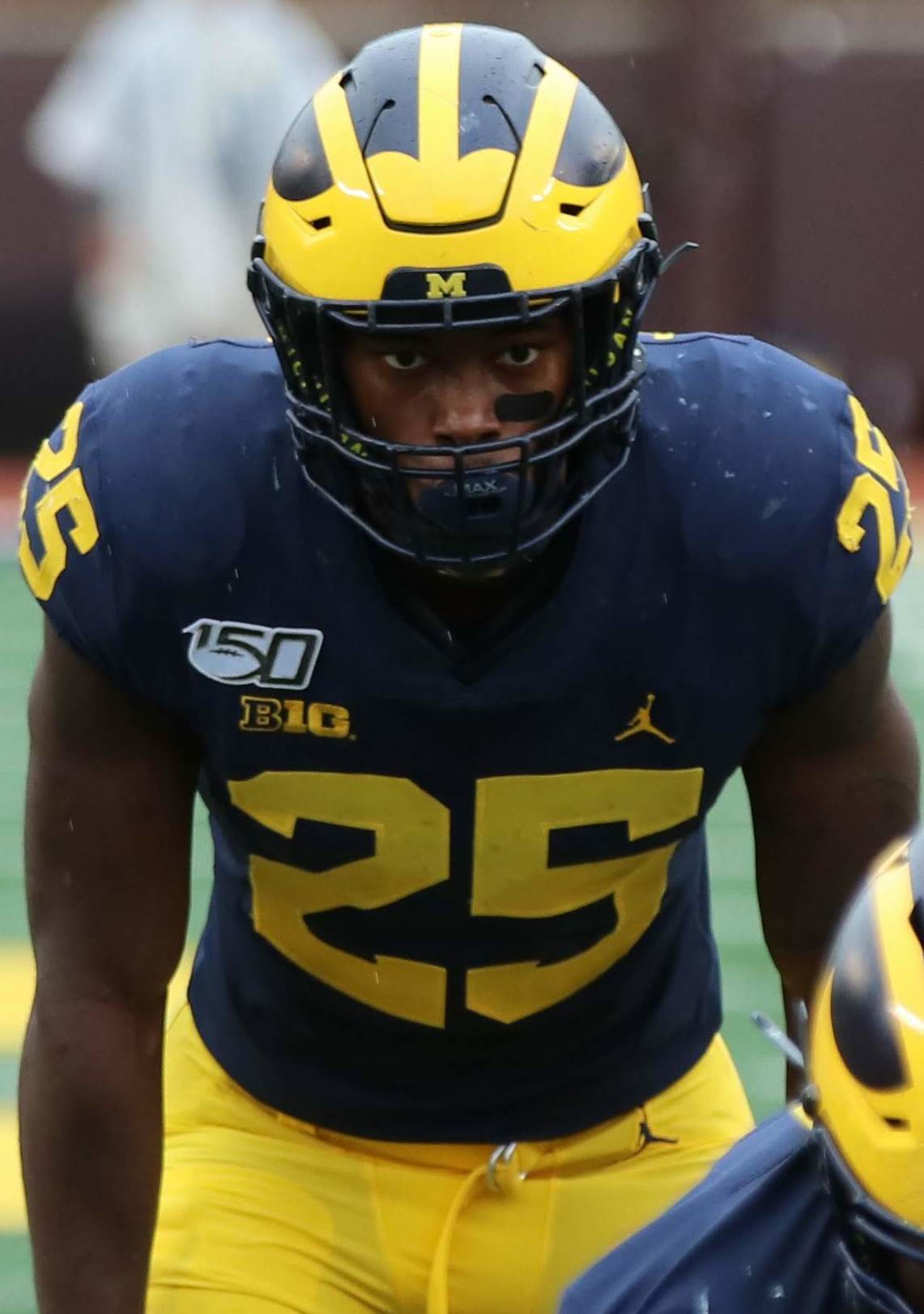
Haskins with Michigan in 2019

On November 27, 2021, in a victory against Ohio State, Haskins recorded five rushing touchdowns. Haskins finished the regular season with 1,232 rushing yards on 244 carries (an average of 5.0 yards per carry) and tied for second in program history at the time, with 18 single-season rushing touchdowns (tying Anthony Thomas and Chris Perry).

He was selected as a first-team All-Big Ten running back, and named a second-team All-American by the AFCA. After two rushing touchdowns in the 2021 Big Ten Championship, Haskins set the single-season program record at the time, with 20 rushing touchdowns, surpassing the previous record of 19 set by Ron Johnson in 1968. His former teammate Blake Corum would surpass Haskins two seasons later, rushing for 27 touchdowns in 2023. At that time and point, Haskins carried the ball 443 times, from 2019 to 2021, without a single fumble – the most in college football over the span.

=== Statistics ===
Season	Team	Conf	GP	Rushing				Receiving			
Season	Team	Conf	GP	Att	Yds	Avg	TD	Rec	Yds	Avg	TD
2018	Michigan	Big Ten	3	0	0	0.0	0	0	0	0.0	0
2019	Michigan	Big Ten	12	121	622	5.1	4	6	40	6.7	0
2020	Michigan	Big Ten	6	61	375	6.1	6	0	0	0.0	0
2021	Michigan	Big Ten	14	270	1,327	4.9	20	18	131	7.3	0
Career			32	452	2,324	5.1	30	24	171	7.1	0

== Professional career ==
Pre-draft measurables
Height	Weight	Arm length	Hand span	Wingspan	Bench press
6 ft 1 3/4 in (1.87 m)	228 lb (103 kg)	31 3/4 in (0.81 m)	9 1/4 in (0.23 m)	6 ft 3 3/4 in (1.92 m)	27 reps
All values from NFL Combine

=== Tennessee Titans ===
Haskins was selected by the Tennessee Titans in the fourth round, 131st overall, of the 2022 NFL draft. On December 29, while helping fill in for injured Derrick Henry, Haskins rushed 12 times for 40 yards and caught two of three targets for 13 yards during a 27–13 Week 17 loss to the Dallas Cowboys.

On August 28, 2023, Haskins was placed on injured reserve. The next day, he was placed on the Commissioner Exempt List due to Haskins' June 2023 arrest for a domestic dispute. He was waived on August 27, 2024.

=== Los Angeles Chargers ===
On August 28, 2024, Haskins was claimed off waivers by the Los Angeles Chargers. In the 2024 season, Haskins had two rushing touchdowns. He mainly played on special teams but had an increased role in the offense later in the season.

Haskins began the 2025 season as one of Los Angeles' auxiliary running backs. After suffering a hamstring injury in Week 7 against the Indianapolis Colts, he was placed on injured reserve on November 1, 2025. Haskins was activated on December 8, ahead of the team's Week 14 matchup against the Philadelphia Eagles.

=== New England Patriots ===
On August 12, 2026, Haskins signed with the New England Patriots. He was released by the Patriots following the acquisition of Corey Kiner on August 29. Kiner was re–signed to the team's practice squad two days later. On September 14, Haskins was released by the Patriots. On October 13, he was re-signed to the practice squad. On October 17, he was released.

=== Cleveland Browns ===
On November 4, 2026, Haskins was signed to the Cleveland Browns practice squad.

== Personal life ==
Haskins' older brother Maurice Alexander was drafted in the fourth round by the St. Louis Rams in the 2014 NFL draft.

On June 30, 2023, Haskins and his ex-girlfriend were both arrested by Davidson County police due to an alleged domestic violence exchange. He was officially charged with aggravated assault by strangulation and released later the same day after posting a $10,000 bond.
