= KFTN-LP =

- Fenton, Missouri; United States
- Frequency: 92.7 MHz
- Branding: KFTN 92.7: Classic Rock

Programming
- Format: Classic rock
- Affiliations: Pacifica Radio Network

Ownership
- Owner: Rockwood School District

History
- First air date: April 13, 2015

Technical information
- Licensing authority: FCC
- Facility ID: 193226
- Class: L1
- ERP: 89 watts
- HAAT: 26 metres (85 ft)
- Transmitter coordinates: 38°31′3″N 90°29′37″W

Links
- Public license information: LMS
- Website: kftn927.com

KFTN-LP (92.7 FM) is a radio station licensed to serve the community of Fenton, Missouri. The station is owned by the Rockwood School District, and airs a classic rock format. In 2019 KFTN was awarded Best High School Radio Station by the Intercollegiate Broadcasting System.

The station was assigned the KFTN-LP call letters by the Federal Communications Commission on March 14, 2014. It was only the second high school radio station in Missouri to receive an FCC license.
