= Tri-County Journal =

The Tri-County Journal is owned by Pulitzer Publications, founded in 1878, the same owner as the St. Louis Post-Dispatch. It covers the local news in Pacific, Eureka, Robertsville, Villa Ridge, Labadie, Catawissa, St. Clair, and Gray Summit.

The Tri-County Journal was formerly delivered free of charge to residents of Jefferson, Franklin, and St. Louis counties on Tuesdays. The paper now requires a subscription.
