= Chesterfield Township, St. Louis County, Missouri =

Township in the US state of Missouri

Coordinates: 38°37′15″N 90°38′59″W

Chesterfield Township is a township in St. Louis County, in the U.S. state of Missouri. Its population was 45,376 as of the 2020 census.
