= Eureka, Missouri =

City in Missouri, US

- City
- Eureka's main street

- Logo
- Interactive map of Eureka, Missouri
- Coordinates: 38°30′10″N 90°38′42″W
- Country: United States
- State: Missouri
- Counties: St. Louis, Jefferson
- Townships: Meramec, Meramec
- Founded: 1858

Government
  - Mayor: Sean Flower

Area
  - Total: 11.22 sq mi (29.06 km^{2})
  - Land: 11.05 sq mi (28.62 km^{2})
  - Water: 0.17 sq mi (0.44 km^{2})
- Elevation: 476 ft (145 m)

Population (2020)
  - Total: 31,646
  - Density: 1,053.7/sq mi (406.85/km^{2})
- Time zone: UTC−6 (Central (CST))
  - Summer (DST): UTC−5 (CDT)
- ZIP code: 63025
- Area code: 636
- FIPS code: 29-22834
- GNIS feature ID: 2394707
- Website: City of Eureka official website

Eureka is a city mainly in St. Louis County, with a small portion in Jefferson County, Missouri, adjacent to Wildwood and Pacific. It is in the extreme southwest of the Greater St. Louis metro area. As of the 2020 census, the city had a population of 31,646. Since 1971, Eureka has been known as the home of the amusement park Mid America Adventure (formerly known as Six Flags St. Louis).

== History ==
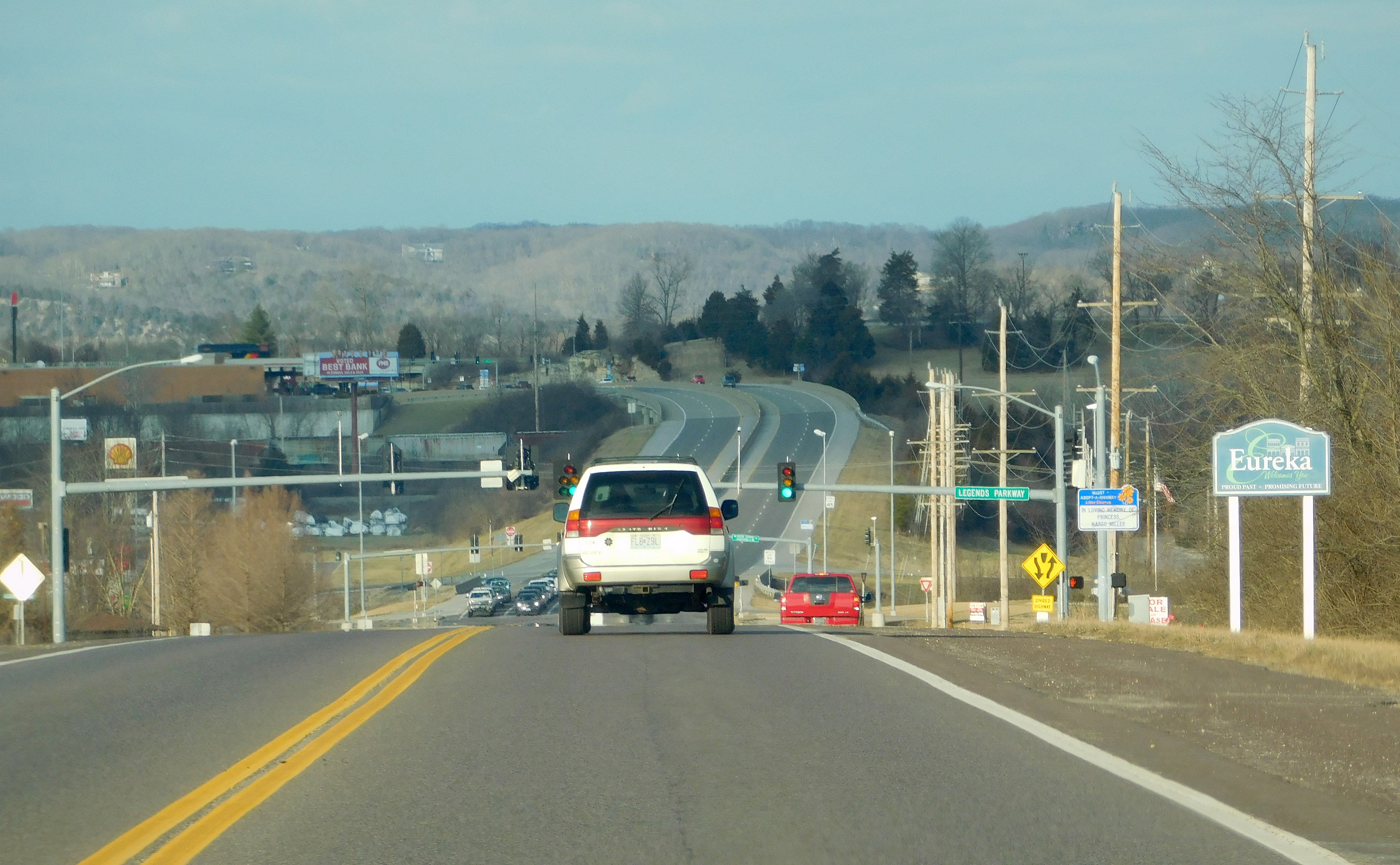
Missouri Route 109 entering Eureka.

The area's first known inhabitants were Shawnee Native Americans on the banks of the Meramec River; archaeological artifacts can still be found today as evidence of their past occupation of the area.

The village of Eureka was platted in 1858 along the route of the Pacific Railroad. By 1890, the village consisted of about 100 homes. As railroad workers cleared the way for the track, they saw level land with little to clear and declared "Eureka!" which is Greek for "I've found it." Thus, Eureka was founded. In 1898, Eureka became home to the St. Louis Children's Industrial Farm, established to give children from St. Louis tenement neighborhoods a chance to experience life in a rural setting. It later became Camp Wyman (now part of Wyman Center) and is one of the oldest camps in the United States. The first high school class in Eureka was held in 1909. Eureka was incorporated as a fourth-class city on April 7, 1954.

Historically, Eureka was wholly within St. Louis County. In September 2019, the city's Board of Aldermen voted to annex two commercial lots—one of them a 72.5-acre tract that houses Kirkwood Materials West, a sand and gravel quarry, and the other a 75-acre field, both at highways 109 and FF—located just across the Meramec River in Jefferson County into the city. On October 1, 2019, the city voted to annex the under construction 549-home Windswept Farms subdivision just to the south into the city. Both annexations were voluntary by the owners.

=== City of Allenton ===
The railroad town of Allenton is a former community on U.S. Route 66 located (now) at the junction of Interstate 44 and Business Loop 44 in western St. Louis County. In 1985, it was annexed by the city of Eureka. The town is currently rural, with adjacent farmland and forested Ozark ridges. This community was declared blighted by St. Louis County in 1973.

== Geography ==
According to the United States Census Bureau, the city has a total area of 10.45 square miles (27.07 km^{2}), of which 10.35 square miles (26.81 km^{2}) is land, and 0.10 square miles (0.26 km^{2}) is water.

=== Floods ===
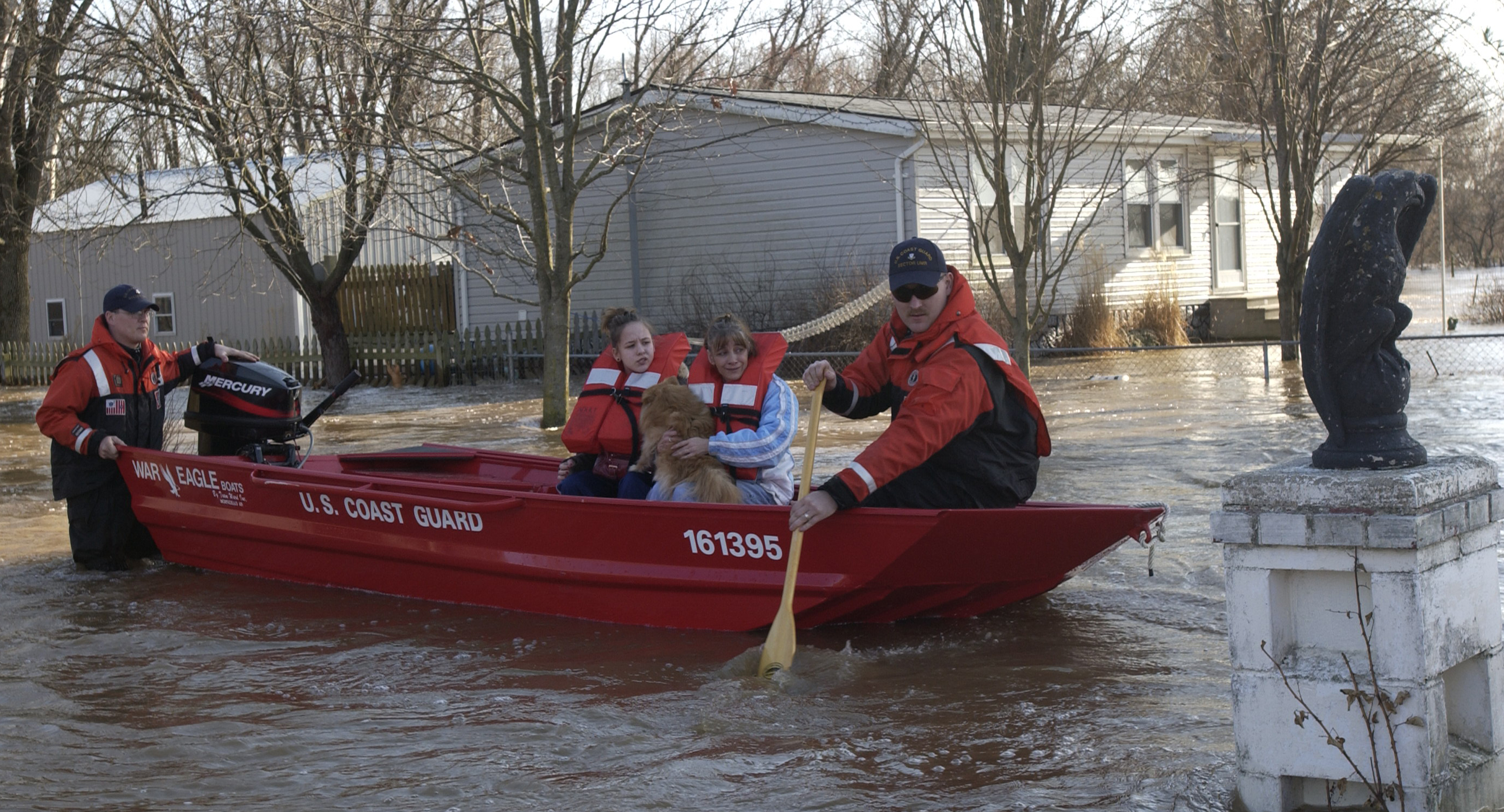
Members of a Coast Guard Disaster Area Response Team rescue two victims and their pet from their flooded home in Eureka in 2008

The city of Eureka has suffered multiple floods, the two most catastrophic being in 2015 and 2017. This caused the city and U.S. Army Corps of Engineers to evaluate a dozen strategic options, from the use of levees and walls, buyouts of high-risk properties, and the restoration of flood plain as water storage. Scientific researchers determined the flooding was a man-made calamity caused in part by "inaccurate Federal Emergency Management Agency flood frequencies based on the assumption that today's river will behave as it has in the past greatly underestimating our real flood risk and leading to inappropriate development in floodways and floodplains."

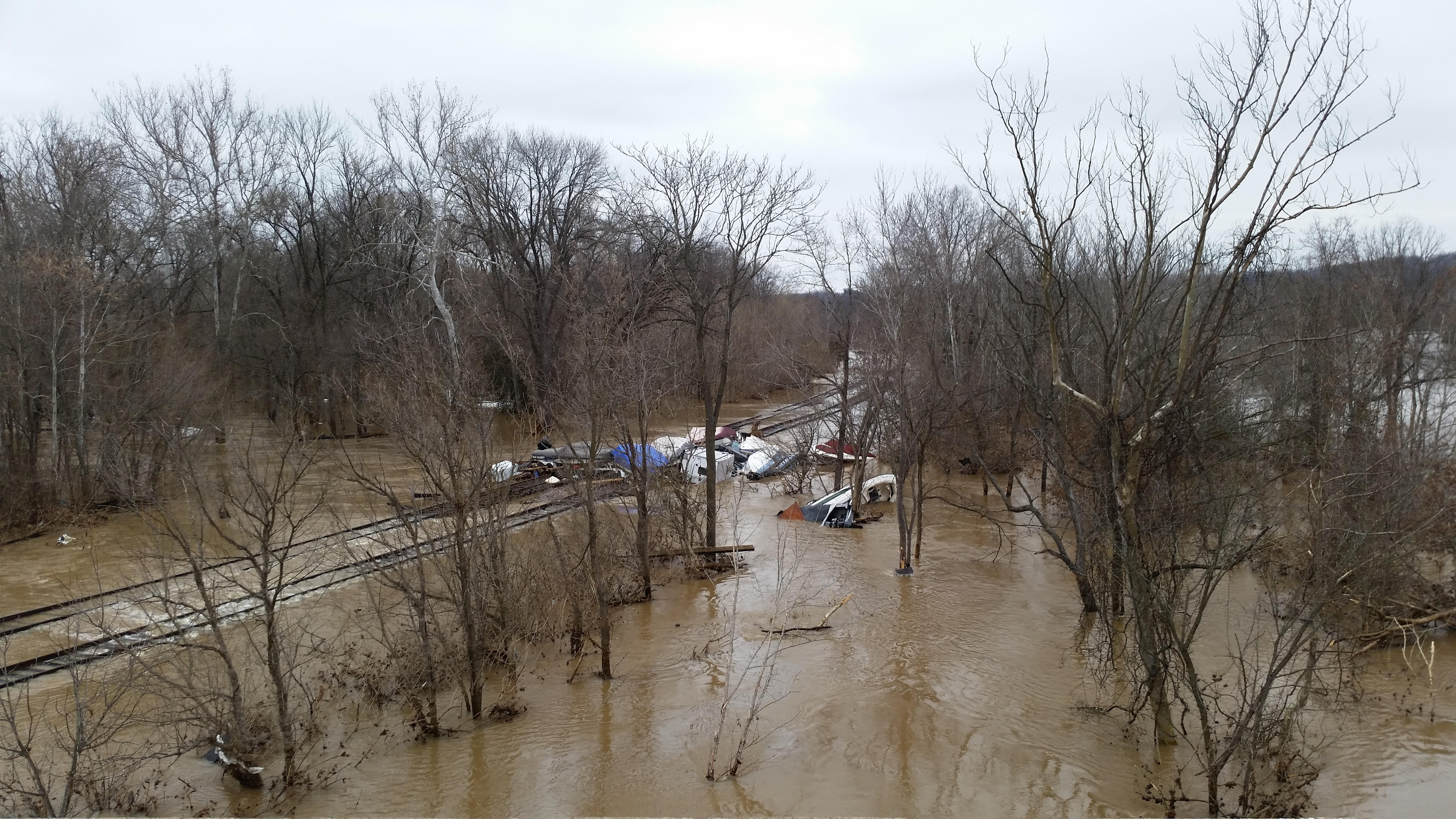
Flooding on the Meramec River near Eureka in 2016

==== 2015 ====
The December 2015 North American storm complex deeply impacted the state of Missouri, with heavy rain and snow causing severe floods. The storm system was responsible for heavy rain that caused severe flooding. Parts of the state were hit with over 10 in (250 mm) of heavy rainfall. In Eureka, more than 100 boat rescues were conducted by the Eureka Fire Department of people and several pets from the second stories of homes near the Meramec River.

==== 2017 ====
A flooding event caused by a strong spring storm system brought multiple rounds of thunderstorms and heavy rain to portions of the Midwest the weekend of April 29–30, 2017. The middle portion of the Mississippi approached historical record flooding. The National Weather Service anticipated a 48.5 ft. crest at Cape Girardeau, Missouri, on May 5, 2017, which was within 6 inches of the January 2, 2016 crest of 48.86 ft. The first floor of a church flooded with about 48 inches of water, the same amount as in December 2015. Floodwater from the Meramec River covered athletic fields at Eureka High School, encroached on the school's buildings, and ruined the gymnasium floor.

== Demographics ==
Historical population
Census	Pop.	Note	%±
1880	141		—
1960	1,134		—
1970	2,384		110.2%
1980	3,862		62.0%
1990	4,683		21.3%
2000	7,676		63.9%
2010	10,189		32.7%
2020	31,646		210.6%
U.S. Decennial Census

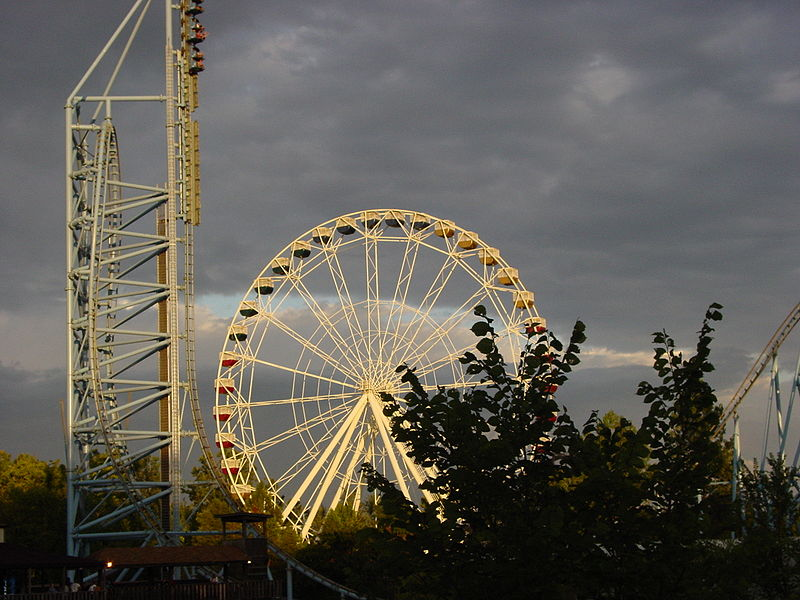
Mid America Adventure in Eureka

=== Racial and ethnic composition ===
Eureka city, Missouri – Racial and ethnic composition Note: the US Census treats Hispanic/Latino as an ethnic category. This table excludes Latinos from the racial categories and assigns them to a separate category. Hispanics/Latinos may be of any race.
Race / Ethnicity (NH = Non-Hispanic)	Pop 2000	Pop 2010	Pop 2020	% 2000	% 2010	% 2020
White alone (NH)	7,414	9,532	30,469	96.59%	93.55%	89.89%
Black or African American alone (NH)	44	82	95	0.57%	0.80%	0.82%
Native American or Alaska Native alone (NH)	9	23	7	0.12%	0.23%	0.06%
Asian alone (NH)	63	192	181	0.82%	1.88%	1.55%
Native Hawaiian or Pacific Islander alone (NH)	0	6	5	0.00%	0.06%	0.04%
Other race alone (NH)	2	5	11	0.03%	0.05%	0.09%
Mixed race or Multiracial (NH)	50	145	490	0.65%	1.42%	4.21%
Hispanic or Latino (any race)	94	204	388	1.22%	2.00%	3.33%
Total	7,676	10,189	31,646	100.00%	100.00%	100.00%

=== 2020 census ===
As of the 2020 census, Eureka had a population of 31,646. The median age was 39.3 years. 27.9% of residents were under the age of 18 and 15.1% were 65 years of age or older. For every 100 females, there were 93.9 males, and for every 100 females age 18 and over, there were 91.6 males age 18 and over.

97.5% of residents lived in urban areas, while 2.5% lived in rural areas.

There were 4,119 households in Eureka, of which 41.3% had children under the age of 18 living in them. Of all households, 62.7% were married-couple households, 12.1% were households with a male householder and no spouse or partner present, and 20.7% were households with a female householder and no spouse or partner present. About 20.2% of all households were made up of individuals, and 11.4% had someone living alone who was 65 years of age or older.

There were 4,408 housing units, of which 6.6% were vacant. The homeowner vacancy rate was 3.1% and the rental vacancy rate was 5.5%.

=== Income and poverty ===
The 2016–2020 5-year American Community Survey estimates show that the median household income was $112,750 (with a margin of error of +/- $13,390) and the median family income was $121,977 (+/- $8,559). Males had a median income of $74,452 (+/- $8,634) versus $47,137 (+/- $8,637) for females. The median income for those above 16 years old was $59,316 (+/- $9,813). Approximately, 0.0% of families and 0.6% of the population were below the poverty line, including 0.0% of those under the age of 18 and 0.8% of those ages 65 or over.

=== 2010 census ===
As of the 2010 census, there were 10,189 people, 3,474 households, and 2,758 families residing in the city. The population density was 984.4 inhabitants per square mile (380.1/km^{2}). There were 3,683 housing units at an average density of 355.8 per square mile (137.4/km^{2}). The racial makeup of the city was 94.9% White, 0.8% African American, 0.2% Native American, 1.9% Asian, 0.1% Pacific Islander, 0.3% from other races, and 1.7% from two or more races. Hispanic or Latino of any race were 2.0% of the population.

There were 3,474 households, of which 46.9% had children under the age of 18 living with them, 66.2% were married couples living together, 9.3% had a female householder with no husband present, 3.9% had a male householder with no wife present, and 20.6% were non-families. 17.2% of all households were made up of individuals, and 5.9% had someone living alone who was 65 years of age or older. The average household size was 2.87, and the average family size was 3.27.

The median age in the city was 37.1 years. 30.9% of residents were under the age of 18; 6% were between the ages of 18 and 24; 26.6% were from 25 to 44; 26.7% were from 45 to 64, and 9.6% were 65 years of age or older. The gender makeup of the city was 49.6% male and 50.4% female.

=== 2000 census ===
As of the 2000 census, there were 7,676 people in the city, organized into 2,487 households and two families. Its population density was 763.7 inhabitants per square mile (294.9/km^{2}). There were 2,622 housing units at an average density of 260.9 per square mile (100.7/km^{2}). The racial makeup of the city was 97.38% White, 0.82% Asian, 0.57% Black or African American, 0.20% Native American, no Pacific Islanders, 0.26% from other races, and 0.77% from two or more races. 1.22% of the population were Hispanic or Latino of any race.

There were 2,487 households, out of which half had children under the age of 18 living with them, 71.6% were married couples living together, 8.2% had a female householder with no husband present, and 17.0% were non-families. 13.8% of all households were made up of individuals, and 4.3% had someone living alone who was 65 years of age or older. The average household size was 2.98, and the average family size was 3.30.

In the city, the population was spread out, with 31.9% under the age of 18, 5.7% from 18 to 24, 34.4% from 25 to 44, 19.5% from 45 to 64, and 8.5% 65 years of age or older. The median age was 34 years. For every 100 females, there were 94.9 males. For every 100 females age 18 and over, there were 89.6 males.

The median income for a household in the city was $74,301, and the median income for a family was $80,625. Males had a median income of $51,799 compared to $33,269 for females. The per capita income for the city was $27,553. 2.2% of the population and 1.3% of families were below the poverty line. Out of the total population, 3.1% of those under the age of 18 and 5.9% of those 65 and older were living below the poverty line.

== Education ==
Rockwood R-Vi School District operates three elementary schools, Lasalle Springs Middle School, and Eureka High School.

The city also contains two private schools: St. Mark's Lutheran Church and School and Most Sacred Heart Church and School.

The city has the Eureka Hills Branch lending library, a branch of the St. Louis County Library. It was moved to a newly built location that opened on June 2, 2021.

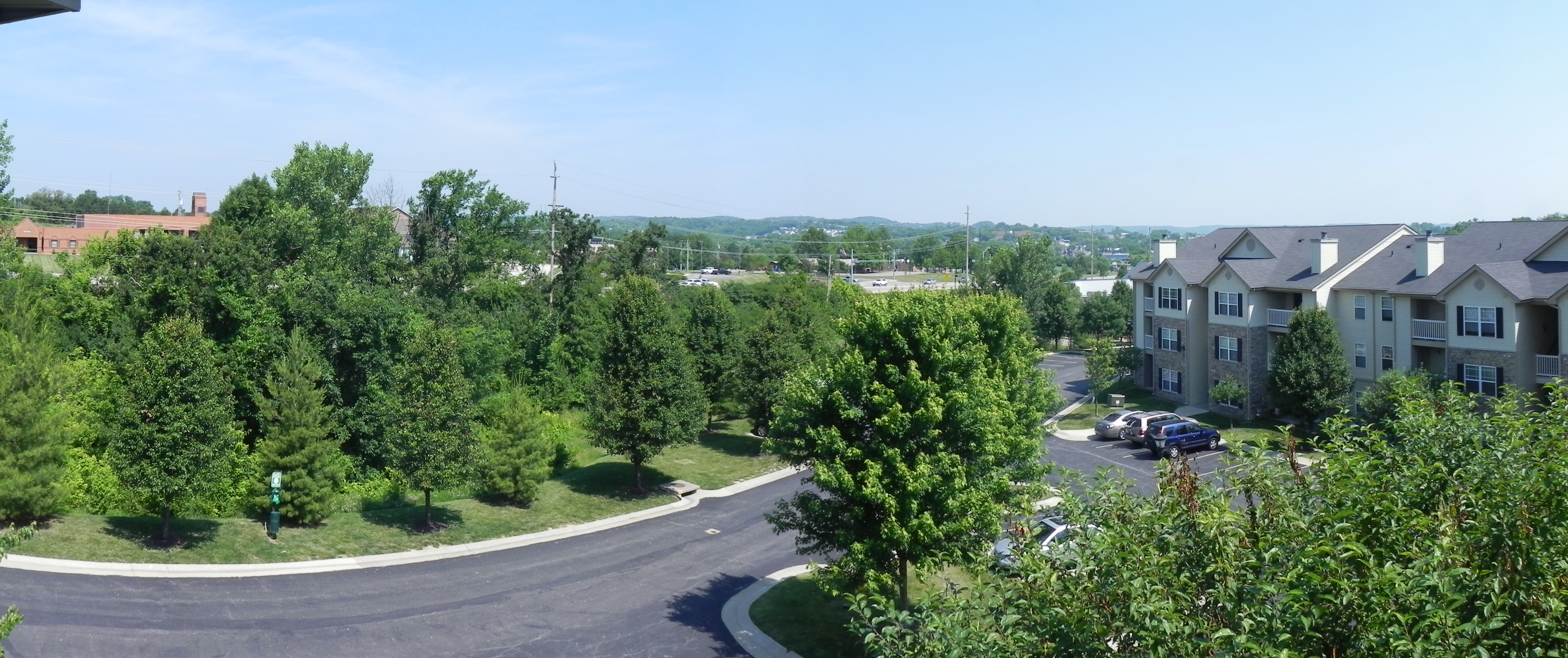
Eureka from the south along Missouri Route 109

== News media ==
Local news coverage for the town and some of its neighbors is provided by the Tri-County Journal, the Eureka and Pacific Current NewsMagazine, and the Washington Missourian.

== Notable people ==
- Clayton Echard, undrafted rookie for the Seattle Seahawks and star of season 26 of The Bachelor.
- Cam Janssen, National Hockey League player
- Bob Klinger, Major League Baseball player
- Rissi Palmer, country singer
