= Eureka High School (Missouri) =

Public high school in Missouri, US

Location
- 4525 Highway 109; Eureka, Missouri 63025; United States; 38.5152°N 90.6282°W

Information
- Type: Public high school
- Established: 1908; 118 years ago
- Principal: Corey Sink
- Teaching staff: 104.94 (on an FTE basis)
- Grades: 9–12
- Enrollment: 1,528 (2025–26)
- Student to teacher ratio: 15.73
- Colors: Purple and gold
- Athletics conference: Suburban Conference
- Nickname: Wildcats
- Website: eurekahs.rsdmo.org

Eureka High School, located in Eureka, Missouri, is a secondary school in the Rockwood School District. Eureka High School was the first high school in what would become the Rockwood School District. The high school opened in 1908 and was fully accredited within four years.

== Student body ==
Eureka has a co-educational student body of 1,528 in the 2025–26 school year. More than half of the students come from LaSalle Springs Middle School, with a large portion of the rest coming from Wildwood Middle School.

Student body composition (2025–26)
Race and ethnicity	Total
White	85.8%
Asian	1.9%
Black	5.7%
Hispanic	4.0%
Multiracial	2.6%

== Notable alumni ==
- Maurice Alexander, NFL player for the Los Angeles Rams, Seattle Seahawks, and Buffalo Bills
- Clayton Echard, undrafted rookie for the Seattle Seahawks and star of season 26 of The Bachelor
- Hassan Haskins, Los Angeles Chargers running back
- Cam Janssen, professional hockey player for the New Jersey Devils and the St. Louis Blues
- Bob Klinger, Major League Baseball pitcher with the Pittsburgh Pirates and Boston Red Sox
- Ricky Montgomery, singer, musician, and songwriter
- Rissi Palmer, country music artist
- Darnell Terrell, University of Missouri cornerback and undrafted rookie for the Cleveland Browns
