= Fenton, Missouri =

City in St. Louis County, Missouri, United States

- City
- Downtown Fenton
- Interactive map of Fenton, Missouri
- Coordinates: 38°31′39″N 90°26′55″W
- Country: United States
- State: Missouri
- County: St. Louis
- Townships: Bonhomme, Meramec
- Founded: 1818
- Incorporated: 1948

Government
  - Mayor: Joe Maurath

Area
  - Total: 6.59 sq mi (17.07 km^{2})
  - Land: 6.27 sq mi (16.24 km^{2})
  - Water: 0.32 sq mi (0.83 km^{2})
- Elevation: 413 ft (126 m)

Population (2020)
  - Total: 3,989
  - Density: 636.0/sq mi (245.58/km^{2})
- Demonym(s): Fentonian, Fentonling
- Time zone: UTC-6 (Central (CST))
  - Summer (DST): UTC-5 (CDT)
- Zip code: 63026
- Area code: 636
- FIPS code: 29-23950
- GNIS feature ID: 2394757
- Website: fentonmo.org

Fenton is a city in St. Louis County, Missouri, United States, and a suburb of St. Louis County. The population was 3,989 at the 2020 census.

== History ==
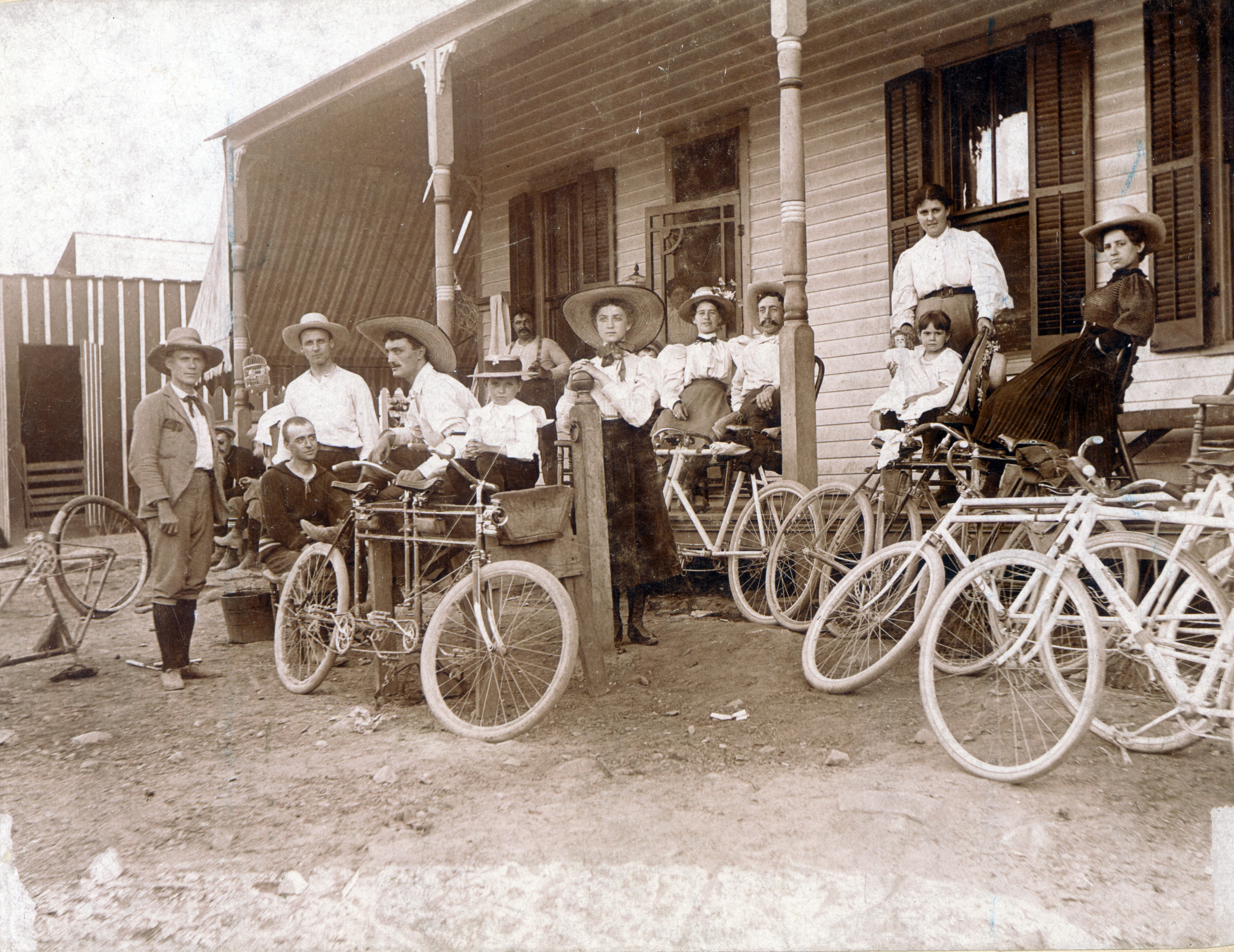
Bicycle party resting in Fenton, Missouri, September 12, 1897

Due to its proximity to fertile land and the Meramec River, the Fenton area has been inhabited for over 900 years. The earliest proof of ancient dwellers was excavated from the "Fenton Mounds", two conical earthen burial mounds located near the southwestern border of Fenton. Diagnostic pottery shards from the mounds indicate they date from the Mississippian times, A.D. 1050 - 1400. In 2001, the mounds were leveled for construction of a Walmart Supercenter.

The Fenton territory was occupied by Native Americans and early settlers in the 1770s. William Lindsay Long founded the city of Fenton on March 23, 1818. The original eight-square-block area is now referred to as "Old Towne Fenton". The city remained unincorporated for the next 130 years. Garrett Hitzert was the city's first mayor after incorporation in 1948, and his leadership helped build the foundation that much of the city's ongoing prosperity has been based on. He conceived of Fenton's expansive commercial business and industrial district that is a centerpiece of the city's fiscal success.

== Geography ==
Fenton is located approximately two miles south of I-44 along the west bank of the Meramec River. The intersection of Missouri routes 30 and 141 lies just to the west.

According to the United States Census Bureau, the city has a total area of 6.38 square miles (16.52 km^{2}), of which 6.05 square miles (15.67 km^{2}) is land and 0.33 square miles (0.85 km^{2}) is water.

== Demographics ==
=== Racial and ethnic composition ===
Fenton city, Missouri – Racial and ethnic composition Note: the US Census treats Hispanic/Latino as an ethnic category. This table excludes Latinos from the racial categories and assigns them to a separate category. Hispanics/Latinos may be of any race.
Race / Ethnicity (NH = Non-Hispanic)	Pop 2000	Pop 2010	Pop 2020	% 2000	% 2010	% 2020
White alone (NH)	4,246	3,795	3,625	97.39%	94.36%	90.87%
Black or African American alone (NH)	17	14	24	0.39%	0.35%	0.60%
Native American or Alaska Native alone (NH)	6	7	0	0.14%	0.17%	0.00%
Asian alone (NH)	41	84	94	0.94%	2.09%	2.36%
Native Hawaiian or Pacific Islander alone (NH)	0	7	1	0.00%	0.17%	0.03%
Other race alone (NH)	0	4	3	0.00%	0.10%	0.08%
Mixed race or Multiracial (NH)	15	35	140	0.34%	0.87%	3.51%
Hispanic or Latino (any race)	35	76	102	0.80%	1.89%	2.56%
Total	4,360	4,022	3,989	100.00%	100.00%	100.00%

Historical population
Census	Pop.	Note	%±
1900	160		—
1910	172		7.5%
1920	146		−15.1%
1930	237		62.3%
1940	171		−27.8%
1950	207		21.1%
1960	1,059		411.6%
1970	2,275		114.8%
1980	2,417		6.2%
1990	3,346		38.4%
2000	4,360		30.3%
2010	4,022		−7.8%
2020	3,989		−0.8%
U.S. Decennial Census; 2011 estimate

=== 2020 census ===
As of the 2020 census, Fenton had a population of 3,989. The median age was 47.0 years. 21.2% of residents were under the age of 18 and 23.5% were 65 years of age or older. For every 100 females, there were 94.6 males, and for every 100 females age 18 and over, there were 92.1 males age 18 and over.

100.0% of residents lived in urban areas, while 0.0% lived in rural areas.

There were 1,562 households, of which 29.2% had children under the age of 18 living in them. Of all households, 63.0% were married-couple households, 12.1% were households with a male householder and no spouse or partner present, and 20.0% were households with a female householder and no spouse or partner present. About 21.2% of all households were made up of individuals and 12.0% had someone living alone who was 65 years of age or older.

There were 1,592 housing units, of which 1.9% were vacant. The homeowner vacancy rate was 0.3% and the rental vacancy rate was 3.4%.

=== 2010 census ===
As of the census of 2010, there were 4,022 people, 1,549 households, and 1,176 families living in the city. The population density was 664.8 inhabitants per square mile (256.7/km^{2}). There were 1,611 housing units at an average density of 266.3 per square mile (102.8/km^{2}). The racial makeup of the city was 95.5% White, 0.4% African American, 0.2% Native American, 2.1% Asian, 0.2% Pacific Islander, 0.3% from other races, and 1.3% from two or more races. Hispanic or Latino of any race were 1.9% of the population.

There were 1,549 households, of which 31.2% had children under the age of 18 living with them, 65.8% were married couples living together, 7.6% had a female householder with no husband present, 2.6% had a male householder with no wife present, and 24.1% were non-families. 19.2% of all households were made up of individuals, and 7.2% had someone living alone who was 65 years of age or older. The average household size was 2.56 and the average family size was 2.94.

The median age in the city was 46.7 years. 21.5% of residents were under the age of 18; 6.5% were between the ages of 18 and 24; 19% were from 25 to 44; 37.3% were from 45 to 64; and 16% were 65 years of age or older. The gender makeup of the city was 48.8% male and 51.2% female.

=== 2000 census ===
As of the census of 2000, there were 4,360 people, 1,587 households, and 1,239 families living in the city. The population density was 710.7 inhabitants per square mile (274.4/km^{2}). There were 1,631 housing units at an average density of 265.9 per square mile (102.7/km^{2}). The racial makeup of the city was 97.98% White, 0.39% African American, 0.16% Native American, 0.94% Asian, 0.18% from other races, and 0.34% from two or more races. Hispanic or Latino of any race were 0.80% of the population.

There were 1,587 households, out of which 35.2% had children under the age of 18 living with them, 68.7% were married couples living together, 6.7% had a female householder with no husband present, and 21.9% were non-families. 18.1% of all households were made up of individuals, and 5.7% had someone living alone who was 65 years of age or older. The average household size was 2.72 and the average family size was 3.11.

In the city, the population was spread out, with 25.5% under the age of 18, 7.5% from 18 to 24, 26.8% from 25 to 44, 29.1% from 45 to 64, and 11.1% who were 65 years of age or older. The median age was 40 years. For every 100 females, there were 96.5 males. For every 100 females age 18 and over, there were 92.0 males.

The median income for a household in the city was $74,708, and the median income for a family was $80,536. Males had a median income of $56,425 versus $34,514 for females. The per capita income for the city was $29,658. About 0.6% of families and 2.1% of the population were below the poverty line, including 1.8% of those under age 18 and 3.8% of those age 65 or over.

== Economy ==
Major corporations in the city include Tacony Corporation and Nooter Eriksen Corporation (makers of industrial equipment), Sachs Electric, UniGroup (owners of United Van Lines and Mayflower Transit, Wolff Shoe, Fabick Caterpillar, and Retail Technology Group, a major national point-of-sale supplier, is based in Fenton. Fenton contains a large industrial park and a newly developed logistics park located on the former Chrysler Assembly site.

=== Chrysler ===
The former Chrysler North and South assembly plants were located on North Highway Drive in Fenton. Opened in 1959 and easily visible from Interstate 44, the Chrysler plant was a cornerstone of the Fenton economy for decades. A residential area was even built near the plant with street names like Fury, Imperial, Dart, and Valiant. In its later years, the South plant assembled Chrysler minivans such as the Chrysler Town & Country and the Dodge Grand Caravan, while the North plant assembled the Dodge Ram truck. The South plant ceased operations in 2008, while the North plant shut down for good in July 2009. In 2013 the site was considered as a possible location for a new stadium for the St. Louis Rams if renovations to the Edward Jones Dome did not materialize. In 2014, a local St. Louis real estate developer purchased the empty 300-acre lot to develop 240 acres of offices, businesses, and industrial buildings, with the remaining 60 acres primarily designated for retail use.

== Athletics ==
The immediate Fenton area is home to some of the most prestigious youth soccer clubs in the nation. The St. Louis Soccer Park abuts the Fenton city limits. It hosts multiple professional and semi-professional soccer matches. St. Louis Soccer Park has hosted several United States qualifier games for both the 1988 Summer Olympics and the 1990 FIFA World Cup. The Saint Louis FC of the USL Championship play their home games at St. Louis Soccer Park. St. Louis Soccer Park is home to SLSG, a soccer academy founded and coached by Scott Gallagher. In 2012, the U18 team from SLSG played a match against the US Soccer U18 team. Fenton itself is home to the Fenton Athletic Association. Ice hockey is also a popular sport in Fenton. The Fenton Forum is home to the Rockwood Summit Falcons ice hockey team as well as the Affton Americans youth and Tier II ice hockey clubs for many home games. Every year, the Missouri Fall Face-Off NCAA lacrosse competition takes place in Fenton.

== Parks ==
Fenton is called the "City of Parks" owing to its extensive park and recreation system. The City has seven fully developed parks on 350-plus acres, including soccer fields, ball diamonds, sand volleyball courts, basketball courts, tennis courts, playgrounds, fishing ponds, and approximately three miles of bike/pedestrian paths through the City. The parks include: Fenton City Park, Bud Weil Memorial Park, Fenton Meramec Greenway, Olde Towne Plaza Riverside Park, Valiant Park, and Westside Park. Plans are being developed for the former Fabick property in the heart of the City. These plans include trails and some passive uses.

=== Heroes Memorial ===
In the spring of 2004 the Mayor of Fenton, Dennis J. Hancock, and the members of the Park Board (Board Chair Glen Scholle and members Jeff Bodi, Charles Jahneke, Mike Lucas, Steve Covault, Gregg Cleveland, Diana Biras and Nannette Clark) determined that their city should build a memorial to the victims of the terrorist attacks on September 11, 2001. It was also determined that the memorial would honor police, firefighters, EMS personnel, and all veterans.

== Education ==
The City of Fenton is served by the Rockwood, Northwest, and Lindbergh school districts. Rockwood Summit High School is located in Fenton and is the primary high school for area students. One private school, St. Paul Catholic School, is located in Fenton. Two others, Our Savior Lutheran School and Heritage Classical Christian Academy, are located adjacent to the city limits. The Meramec Valley Branch of the St. Louis County Library system is in Fenton, although a new, larger facility is open just outside the city limits.

== Notable people ==
- Josh Arnold, host on The Bob & Tom Show
- Brian Boehringer, former pitcher for the New York Yankees and San Francisco Giants
- Nicole Galloway, State Auditor of Missouri
- Joyce Meyer, Christian author and speaker
- Jackson Rutledge, pitcher for the Washington Nationals
- Ken Schrader, NASCAR driver
- Sunil Bhave, Judge, Circuit Court of Cook County, Illinois
- Mike Wallace, stock car racing driver
- Brandon Williams, NFL defensive lineman

== See also ==
- List of cities in Missouri
