= Clarkson Valley, Missouri =

- City
- Logo

- Location of Clarkson Valley, Missouri
- Coordinates: 38°37′32″N 90°35′40″W
- Country: United States
- State: Missouri
- County: St. Louis
- Township: Chesterfield
- Incorporated: 1950

Government
  - Type: Mayor–council
  - Mayor: Sue McNamara

Area
  - Total: 2.73 sq mi (7.08 km^{2})
  - Land: 2.69 sq mi (6.98 km^{2})
  - Water: 0.039 sq mi (0.10 km^{2})
- Elevation: 633 ft (193 m)

Population (2020)
  - Total: 2,609
  - Density: 968.2/sq mi (373.81/km^{2})
- Time zone: UTC-6 (Central (CST))
  - Summer (DST): UTC-5 (CDT)
- Postal code: 63005
- Area code: 636
- FIPS code: 29-14176
- GNIS feature ID: 2393543
- Website: www.clarksonvalley.org

Clarkson Valley is a city in Chesterfield Township, St. Louis County, Missouri, United States. The population was 2,609 at the 2020 census.

== Geography ==
According to the United States Census Bureau, the city has a total area of 2.75 square miles (7.12 km^{2}), of which 2.70 square miles (6.99 km^{2}) is land and 0.05 square miles (0.13 km^{2}) is water.

== Demographics ==
Historical population
Census	Pop.	Note	%±
1960	137		—
1970	157		14.6%
1980	1,435		814.0%
1990	2,508		74.8%
2000	2,675		6.7%
2010	2,632		−1.6%
2020	2,609		−0.9%
U.S. Decennial Census

Clarkson Valley is an affluent St. Louis suburb in the 63005 zip code. The Average Household income in and around the city was $257,536 in 2019, which was down from $269,606 in 2018 but up from $177,242 a decade earlier.

=== Racial and ethnic composition ===
Clarkson Valley city, Missouri – Racial and ethnic composition Note: the US Census treats Hispanic/Latino as an ethnic category. This table excludes Latinos from the racial categories and assigns them to a separate category. Hispanics/Latinos may be of any race.
Race / Ethnicity (NH = Non-Hispanic)	Pop 2000	Pop 2010	Pop 2020	% 2000	% 2010	% 2020
White alone (NH)	2,490	2,402	2,316	93.08%	91.26%	88.77%
Black or African American alone (NH)	36	39	32	1.35%	1.48%	1.23%
Native American or Alaska Native alone (NH)	5	0	4	0.19%	0.00%	0.15%
Asian alone (NH)	86	93	102	3.21%	3.53%	3.91%
Native Hawaiian or Pacific Islander alone (NH)	0	4	0	0.00%	0.15%	0.00%
Other race alone (NH)	0	3	8	0.00%	0.11%	0.31%
Mixed race or Multiracial (NH)	26	34	62	0.97%	1.29%	2.38%
Hispanic or Latino (any race)	32	57	85	1.20%	2.17%	3.26%
Total	2,675	2,632	2,609	100.00%	100.00%	100.00%

=== 2020 census ===
As of the 2020 census, Clarkson Valley had a population of 2,609. The median age was 46.8 years. 25.0% of residents were under the age of 18 and 20.5% of residents were 65 years of age or older. For every 100 females there were 102.1 males, and for every 100 females age 18 and over there were 100.2 males age 18 and over.

100.0% of residents lived in urban areas, while 0.0% lived in rural areas.

There were 863 households in Clarkson Valley, of which 37.5% had children under the age of 18 living in them. Of all households, 83.9% were married-couple households, 7.0% were households with a male householder and no spouse or partner present, and 8.1% were households with a female householder and no spouse or partner present. About 9.3% of all households were made up of individuals and 6.5% had someone living alone who was 65 years of age or older.

There were 911 housing units, and 5.3% of housing units were vacant. The homeowner vacancy rate was 0.6% and the rental vacancy rate was 0.0%. The population density was 966.3 inhabitants per square mile (373.1/km^{2}), and the average housing-unit density was 337.4 per square mile (130.3/km^{2}).

=== 2010 census ===
As of the census of 2010, there were 2,632 people, 882 households, and 801 families living in the city. The population density was 974.8 inhabitants per square mile (376.4/km^{2}). There were 913 housing units at an average density of 338.1 per square mile (130.5/km^{2}). The racial makeup of the city was 92.9% White, 1.5% African American, 3.5% Asian, 0.2% Pacific Islander, 0.6% from other races, and 1.3% from two or more races. Hispanic or Latino of any race were 2.2% of the population.

There were 882 households, of which 40.8% had children under the age of 18 living with them, 85.3% were married couples living together, 3.3% had a female householder with no husband present, 2.3% had a male householder with no wife present, and 9.2% were non-families. 7.9% of all households were made up of individuals, and 4.4% had someone living alone who was 65 years of age or older. The average household size was 2.98 and the average family size was 3.14.

The median age in the city was 46.9 years. 27.8% of residents were under the age of 18; 5.6% were between the ages of 18 and 24; 13.1% were from 25 to 44; 39.1% were from 45 to 64; and 14.5% were 65 years of age or older. The gender makeup of the city was 49.7% male and 50.3% female.

=== 2000 census ===
As of the census of 2000, there were 2,675 people, 884 households, and 818 families living in the city. The population density was 995.1 inhabitants per square mile (384.2/km^{2}). There were 898 housing units at an average density of 334.1 per square mile (129.0/km^{2}). The racial makeup of the city was 94.17% White, 1.35% African American, 0.19% Native American, 3.21% Asian, 0.11% from other races, and 0.97% from two or more races. Hispanic or Latino of any race were 1.20% of the population.

There were 884 households, out of which 42.2% had children under the age of 18 living with them, 89.8% were married couples living together, 1.2% had a female householder with no husband present, and 7.4% were non-families. 6.0% of all households were made up of individuals, and 1.8% had someone living alone who was 65 years of age or older. The average household size was 3.03 and the average family size was 3.16.

In the city, the population was spread out, with 27.9% under the age of 18, 5.6% from 18 to 24, 19.1% from 25 to 44, 39.7% from 45 to 64, and 7.6% who were 65 years of age or older. The median age was 44 years. For every 100 females, there were 99.3 males. For every 100 females age 18 and over, there were 100.2 males.

The median income for a household in the city was $153,933, and the median income for a family was $156,489. Males had a median income of $100,000 versus $48,438 for females. The per capita income for the city was $63,563. About 0.5% of families and 0.4% of the population were below the poverty line, including none of those under the age of eighteen or sixty-five or over.
