= Ellisville, Missouri =

City in St. Louis County, Missouri, United States

- City
- Seal

- Location of Ellisville, Missouri
- Coordinates: 38°35′23″N 90°35′18″W
- Country: United States
- State: Missouri
- County: St. Louis
- Townships: Wildhorse, Lafayette, Meramec

Government
  - Mayor: Mike Roemerman

Area
  - Total: 4.37 sq mi (11.31 km^{2})
  - Land: 4.37 sq mi (11.31 km^{2})
  - Water: 0 sq mi (0.00 km^{2})
- Elevation: 722 ft (220 m)

Population (2020)
  - Total: 9,985
  - Density: 2,287.3/sq mi (883.15/km^{2})
- Time zone: UTC-6 (Central (CST))
  - Summer (DST): UTC-5 (CDT)
- ZIP codes: 63011, 63021, 63038
- Area code: 636
- FIPS code: 29-21898
- GNIS feature ID: 2394664
- Website: www.ellisville.mo.us

Ellisville is a city in St. Louis County, Missouri, United States, that is within Greater St. Louis. It is a western outer-ring suburb of St. Louis. The population was 9,985 at the 2020 census.

In 2009, Money magazine ranked Ellisville #25 on the annual Best Places to Live in America list. The city is also currently home to an EPA Superfund site.

== History ==
Captain James Harvey Ferris of Kentucky settled Ellisville some time before 1837. He brought slaves with him when he settled his property south of Manchester and west of Kiefer Creek Road, where the house that became known as the "Ellis House" was constructed. The bricks used for its construction were handmade by the slaves, so it was also called the "Brick Place".

Captain Ferris sold the house to Vespasian Ellis, a newspaper editor and prominent Know-Nothing in St. Louis whose edited works include the Daily American Organ, the Old School Democrat, the Native American Bulletin, the Washington Temperance Paper, and the Native American. In 1842, Ellis became the United States consul to Venezuela. He ran several ads in the Native American Bulletin in an effort to sell his Ellisville farm. As a result, it was sold to William A. Hereford in 1842 or 1843. Hereford was a Virginian and is credited with the naming of Ellisville after his former post office in Ellisville, Virginia. Hereford opened the first post office here on May 2, 1843. Some believe that the Ellis House itself actually served as the post office for a time. All historical accounts of the area give the same history, but none state clearly whether the town was named for Vespasian Ellis or by William Hereford for his Virginia post office.

Hereford sold to Samuel Wilson, and he sold to Major Clarkson of Kentucky for whom Clarkson Road is named. Major Clarkson sold to Captain Benjamin F. Hutchinson of Kentucky, a steamboat captain and the owner of at least three steamboats. Captain Hutchinson raised fine horses and planted extensive orchards, greatly improving the surrounding countryside. In 1868, Captain Hutchinson subdivided his farm into small lots.

Adam Doering purchased the brick house and a considerable portion of the land. John Henry William Rasch purchased the house about 1896 from the Doerings. The Ellisville House stood until 1969 when it was razed.

Ellisville was incorporated as a village in 1932 to create a public school district. On November 12, 1957, voters approved a proposition to become a 4th class city.

== Geography ==
According to the United States Census Bureau, the city has a total area of 4.39 square miles (11.37 km^{2}), all land.

Located 13 miles (21 km) west of the western city limits of St. Louis, Ellisville is located approximately 5 miles (8.0 km) south of Interstate 64, five miles north of Interstate 44 and 7 miles (11 km) west of Interstate 270. There are two primary arterial roads which bisect Ellisville: Missouri Route 100 (Manchester Road) and Missouri Route 340 (Clarkson Road). Ellisville is bordered by the city of Clarkson Valley to the north, the city of Ballwin to the east and southeast, unincorporated St. Louis County to the south, and the city of Wildwood to the west.

== Demographics ==
=== Racial and ethnic composition ===
Ellisville city, Missouri – Racial and ethnic composition Note: the US Census treats Hispanic/Latino as an ethnic category. This table excludes Latinos from the racial categories and assigns them to a separate category. Hispanics/Latinos may be of any race.
Race / Ethnicity (NH = Non-Hispanic)	Pop 2000	Pop 2010	Pop 2020	% 2000	% 2010	% 2020
White alone (NH)	8,586	8,216	8,143	94.31%	89.96%	81.55%
Black or African American alone (NH)	144	170	246	1.58%	1.86%	2.46%
Native American or Alaska Native alone (NH)	10	11	4	0.11%	0.12%	0.04%
Asian alone (NH)	187	392	729	2.05%	4.29%	7.30%
Native Hawaiian or Pacific Islander alone (NH)	0	0	0	0.00%	0.00%	0.00%
Other race alone (NH)	10	12	43	0.11%	0.13%	0.43%
Mixed race or Multiracial (NH)	61	109	415	0.67%	1.19%	4.16%
Hispanic or Latino (any race)	106	223	405	1.16%	2.44%	4.06%
Total	9,104	9,133	9,985	100.00%	100.00%	100.00%

Historical population
Census	Pop.	Note	%±
1940	288		—
1950	628		118.1%
1960	2,732		335.0%
1970	4,681		71.3%
1980	6,233		33.2%
1990	7,545		21.0%
2000	9,104		20.7%
2010	9,133		0.3%
2020	9,985		9.3%
U.S. Decennial Census

=== 2020 census ===
As of the 2020 census, Ellisville had a population of 9,985. The median age was 46.3 years. 20.4% of residents were under the age of 18 and 24.8% of residents were 65 years of age or older. For every 100 females there were 87.9 males, and for every 100 females age 18 and over there were 84.7 males age 18 and over.

98.8% of residents lived in urban areas, while 1.2% lived in rural areas.

The population density was 2,284.9 per square mile (882.8/km^{2}). There were 4,414 housing units, of which 4.8% were vacant, and the homeowner and rental vacancy rates were 1.1% and 4.8%, respectively. There were 4,200 households in Ellisville, of which 27.8% had children under the age of 18 living in them. Ellisville also had 2,680 families. Of all households, 51.4% were married-couple households, 13.2% were households with a male householder and no spouse or partner present, and 30.8% were households with a female householder and no spouse or partner present. About 31.1% of all households were made up of individuals and 21.4% had someone living alone who was 65 years of age or older. The average household size was 2.5 and the average family size was 3.1.

=== Income and poverty ===
The 2016–2020 5-year American Community Survey estimates show that the median household income was $78,961 (with a margin of error of +/- $6,910) and the median family income was $104,214 (+/- $15,693). Males had a median income of $53,276 (+/- $2,869) versus $34,523 (+/- $6,429) for females. The median income for those above 16 years old was $45,596 (+/- $5,363). Approximately, 1.4% of families and 2.9% of the population were below the poverty line, including 2.1% of those under the age of 18 and 3.1% of those ages 65 or over.

=== 2010 census ===
As of the census of 2010, there were 9,169 people, 3,669 households, and 2,469 families living in the city. The population density was 2,080.4 inhabitants per square mile (803.2/km^{2}). There were 3,802 housing units at an average density of 866.1 per square mile (334.4/km^{2}). The racial makeup of the city was 91.7% White, 1.9% African American, 0.1% Native American, 4.3% Asian, 0.6% from other races, and 1.4% from two or more races. Hispanic or Latino of any race were 2.4% of the population.

There were 3,621 households, of which 31.8% had children under the age of 18 living with them, 57.6% were married couples living together, 8.3% had a female householder with no husband present, 3.1% had a male householder with no wife present, and 31.0% were non-families. 27.5% of all households were made up of individuals, and 16.2% had someone living alone who was 65 years of age or older. The average household size was 2.47 and the average family size was 3.04.

The median age in the city was 44.7 years. 23.7% of residents were under the age of 18; 5.7% were between the ages of 18 and 24; 21% were from 25 to 44; 29.7% were from 45 to 64; and 19.8% were 65 years of age or older. The gender makeup of the city was 46.7% male and 53.3% female.

=== 2000 census ===
As of the census of 2000, there were 9,104 people, 3,209 households, and 2,486 families living in the city. The population density was 2,094.1 inhabitants per square mile (808.5/km^{2}). There were 3,292 housing units at an average density of 757.2 per square mile (292.4/km^{2}). The racial makeup of the city was 95.11% White, 1.58% African American, 0.11% Native American, 2.05% Asian, 0.38% from other races, and 0.76% from two or more races. Hispanic or Latino of any race were 1.16% of the population.

There were 3,209 households, out of which 39.7% had children under the age of 18 living with them, 66.9% were married couples living together, 8.2% had a female householder with no husband present, and 22.5% were non-families. 19.4% of all households were made up of individuals, and 9.3% had someone living alone who was 65 years of age or older. The average household size was 2.74 and the average family size was 3.16.

In the city the population was spread out, with 27.2% under the age of 18, 5.7% from 18 to 24, 28.7% from 25 to 44, 23.8% from 45 to 64, and 14.6% who were 65 years of age or older. The median age was 39 years. For every 100 females, there were 91.2 males. For every 100 females age 18 and over, there were 86.8 males.

The median income for a household in the city was $65,016, and the median income for a family was $74,375. Males had a median income of $55,224 versus $32,062 for females. The per capita income for the city was $27,379. About 1.9% of families and 3.5% of the population were below the poverty line, including 3.3% of those under age 18 and 5.4% of those age 65 or over.

== Transportation ==
=== Highways and major roads ===
Missouri Route 340 (Clarkson Road) runs on north-south through much of Ellisville before turning into Kiefer Creek Road. Missouri Route 100 (Manchester Road) runs east-west through Ellisville.

=== Public transportation ===
Public transportation is provided by Metro and connects Ellisville to many other portions of Greater St. Louis by bus routes.

== Attractions ==
The Ellisville Dog Park, which opened in October 2012, is located in Bluebird Park. Ellisville also includes walking trails, creeks, and many restaurants and shops.

== Education ==
The St. Louis County Library Daniel Boone Branch and Asian Center is located in Ellisville.

=== Public schools ===
Three schools from the Rockwood School District—Ellisville Elementary, Ridge Meadows Elementary, and Crestview Middle—are located in Ellisville.

=== Private schools ===
St. Clare of Assisi School and St. John School are two private schools located within Ellisville.

== See also ==
- List of cities in Missouri
