= Missouri Route 141 =

State highway in Missouri, U.S.

Route 141
- Route 141 highlighted in red

Route information
- Maintained by MoDOT
- Length: 30.902 mi (49.732 km)

Major junctions
- South end: US 61 / US 67 in Arnold
- I-55 in Arnold; I-44 / US 50 in Fenton; I-64 / US 40 / US 61 in Town & Country; Route 364 in Maryland Heights; I-70 in Maryland Heights
- North end: Route 370 in Bridgeton

Location
- Country: United States
- State: Missouri
- Counties: Jefferson, St. Louis

Highway system
- Missouri State Highway System; Interstate; US; State; Supplemental
← Route 139	→ Route 142

Route 141, also known as Woods Mill Road in parts of St. Louis County, is a state highway located in the western St. Louis metropolitan area. Its northern terminus is at Route 370 in Bridgeton; its southern terminus is at U.S. Route 61/U.S. Route 67 in Arnold, in Jefferson County. The northern stretches of the highway are often referred to as the Maryland Heights Expressway or Earth City Expressway.

== Route description ==
For the majority of its duration, Route 141 is a divided highway with four to eight lanes.

=== Jefferson County ===
In Jefferson County, Route 141 is a four-lane highway. It has a southern terminus at U.S. Route 61/U.S. Route 67 in Arnold. At this point, it is an at-grade route with business driveways and traffic lights. It continues northwest and has a hybrid SPUI and diamond interchange with I-55. After the interchange, it becomes a rural highway with two lanes on each side of a wide grass median. While nearing the Meramec River, the highway has an at-grade intersection with Old Missouri State Road. After this intersection, the grassy median ends and the road is instead separated by a Jersey barrier. The route then has a diamond interchange with the Route 21 freeway. After this interchange, Route 141 again sports a wide grassy median. It continues north and crosses the county line into Fenton in St. Louis County.

=== St. Louis County ===
Route 141 enters St. Louis County in Fenton. It has an interchange with Route 30 and widens into a six- to eight-lane divided highway. Heading north, Route 141 passes a plaza to the left that includes various restaurants. After the plaza, Route 141 heads into a suburban area and has at-grade interchanges with several collector roads. The highway heads northeast and has an interchange with Interstate 44 in Valley Park. Shortly after this interchange, Route 141 crosses the Meramec River and the Meramec River Greenway and enters Valley Park.

In Valley Park, Route 141 passes over, and then under, a pair of railroad tracks and has several at-grade intersections with local road. Heading north, the highway passes the Valley Park water tower and abruptly turns northwest. The road then enters Twin Oaks and has a SPUI with Big Bend Road. Shortly after the interchange, Route 141 enters Manchester. The road weaves through suburban areas, and after an at-grade intersection with Carmen Road, Route 141 gains outer roads in both directions. The highway then has a SPUI with Missouri Route 100 (Manchester Road) while heading directly north. After this interchange, Route 141 has an at-grade intersection with a plaza containing a Costco and a Walmart Supercenter.

Past the intersection, Route 141 serves as a border between Missouri River Township and Ballwin. The highway continues to mainly serve suburban areas. The road weaves northeast and enters Town and Country. Route 141 then has a hybrid trumpet interchange with Clayton Road and briefly becomes a controlled-access highway. Woods Mill Road serves as an outer road. The freeway ends at a signalized hybrid interchange with Interstate 64/US 40/US 61. Maryville University is located to the east. Route 141 subsequently clips the eastern edge of Chesterfield and passes St. Luke's Hospital.

Past this point, Route 141 becomes a controlled-access freeway. It has a SPUI with Ladue Road (Route AB). The highway curves northeastwards, passing Parkway Central High School, which is located to the west of the road. Shortly after passing the school, Route 141 curves back northward and heads through a wooded area. Subsequently, Route 141 as a SPUI interchange with Route 340 (Olive Boulevard). Route 141 becomes elevated after the interchange, crossing over Creve Coeur Creek and several other streams, and passing a neighborhood to the west. Route 141 then crosses Waterworks Road and railroad tracks, entering Maryland Heights. The name of the road changes to Maryland Heights Expressway. Shortly after entering Maryland Heights, Route 141 has a SPUI with Route 364, After that, Route 141 passes Hollywood Casino Amphitheatre, and has an interchange with Interstate 70, and the highway splits between north and southbound and reconnecting at Route 180 (St Charles Rock Road)

The highway meets its northern terminus after the interchange with Route 370 at Missouri Bottom Road.

== History ==
Old Highway 141 was a two-lane road built in the 1930s. The idea of an newer, divided highway carrying the Route 141 designation dates to the 1970s, when regional highway planners adopted the idea of an "outer belt" west of I-270. In 1976, Frank Kriz, then the district state highway engineer, called 141 an "old ridge-runner." The highways had traffic jams due to suburban growth. That same year, construction began for a new, four-lane Highway 141 in Jefferson County. Subsequent progress included a new bridge over the Meramec River at Valley Park in 1986 and a new interchange at Manchester Road in 1999. The section of Route 141 between Interstate 64 and the St. Louis County/Jefferson County line was upgraded to six lanes in a project completed in 2003.

=== Extension ===
In August 2012, a six-lane realignment opened between Ladue Road and Page Avenue (Route 364), with interchanges at Ladue, Olive (Route 340), and Page. The section between Page and Olive (tentatively titled the Page-Olive Connector), which was constructed by St. Louis County has been turned over to the Missouri Department of Transportation and designated as Route 141. Maryland Heights Expressway (the section from Page north to I-70) and Earth City Expressway (the section from I-70 north to its terminus at Route 370) have also been designated as 141. As such, Route 141 now runs from US 61/67 in Arnold to Route 370 in Bridgeton.

The Missouri Department of Transportation (MoDOT) in cooperation with the St. Louis County Department of Highways and Traffic (DHT) expanded Route 141. 1 between just south of Ladue Road (Route AB) to Olive Boulevard (Route 340). DHT extended Route 141 from Olive Boulevard to the Page Avenue Extension (Route 364) at the Maryland Heights Expressway which links to the Earth City Expressway which continues north to Route 370 where it then turns into Missouri Bottom Road via Aubuchon Road. SPUIs were constructed at Ladue Road and Olive Blvd. There were some construction constraints with the part of the project between Olive and Page. DHT held studies of the environment to decide how to maneuver construction without disturbing some of the native wetlands in the corridor. During heavy rain, the current intersection at Creve Coeur Mill Road and Olive has the potential to flood, and most of the area along Creve Coeur Mill Road are either wetlands or farmland that lies in a flood plain.

St. Louis County Executive Charlie Dooley had called the project "one of St. Louis County's largest and most important infrastructure improvements this decade." The economic impact of the construction project was not nearly as massive as the upgrading and realignment project on Interstate 64/Highway 40. This construction project was estimated to have a $20 billion economic impact and create over 170,000 jobs during the 2010 decade.

== Major intersections ==
County	Location	mi	km	Destinations	Notes
Jefferson	Arnold	0.000	0.000	US 61 / US 67 (Jeffco Boulevard)	Southern terminus at an at-grade intersection
Jefferson	Arnold	0.379	0.610	I-55 – St. Louis, Cape Girardeau	Hybrid interchange (SPUI and diamond); exit 191 on I-55
Jefferson	Arnold	3.585	5.769	Route 21 – St. Louis, Hillsboro	Diamond interchange
St. Louis	Fenton	7.583	12.204	Route 30 – St. Louis, St. Clair	Diamond interchange
St. Louis	Fenton	11.127	17.907	I-44 / US 50 – St. Louis, Rolla	Exit 272 on I-44 / US 50
St. Louis	Fenton	11.278	18.150	North Outer Road	Interchange
St. Louis	Twin Oaks	13.255	21.332	Big Bend Road	SPUI
St. Louis	Manchester	15.137	24.361	Route 100 / Lewis and Clark Trail (Manchester Road)	SPUI built in 1999
St. Louis	Town & Country	17.456	28.093	Route HH (Clayton Road)	Hybrid Trumpet Interchange
St. Louis	Town & Country	18.213	29.311	Salt Mill Road / South Outer 40 Drive	Interchange with traffic circles
St. Louis	Town & Country	18.665	30.038	I-64 / US 40 / US 61 (Avenue of the Saints) – St. Louis, Wentzville	Exit 22 on I-64 / US 40 / US 61.
St. Louis	Chesterfield	19.974	32.145	Route AB (Ladue Road)	SPUI. Northern Extension begins
St. Louis	Chesterfield	21.611	34.780	Route 340 (Olive Boulevard)	SPUI
St. Louis	Maryland Heights	23.563	37.921	Route 364 – St. Louis, St. Charles	Exit 17 on Route 364
St. Louis	Maryland Heights	27.983	45.034	I-70 – St. Louis, Kansas City	Cloverleaf interchange; exit 231 on I-70
St. Louis	Bridgeton	29.709	47.812	St. Charles Rock Road	At-grade-intersection
St. Louis	Bridgeton	30.763	49.508	Route 370 – St. Louis, St. Charles	Northern terminus at a diamond interchange; exit 9 on Route 370
St. Louis	Bridgeton	30.902	49.732	Missouri Bottom Road north	Continuation beyond northern terminus
1.000 mi = 1.609 km; 1.000 km = 0.621 mi
