= Gloria Weber =

American politician (1933–2020)

Member of the Missouri House of Representatives from the 99th district
- In office January 6, 1993 – January 4, 1995
- Preceded by: William A. Raisch
- Succeeded by: Cathy Enz

Personal details
- Born: Gloria Richie; April 4, 1933 St. Louis, Missouri, US
- Died: January 21, 2020 (aged 86) Ballwin, Missouri, US
- Party: Democratic

Gloria Richie Weber (April 4, 1933 – January 21, 2020) was an American politician who served in the Missouri House of Representatives from the 99th district from 1993 to 1995.

Weber died on January 21, 2020, in Ballwin, Missouri at age 86.
