= John F. Kennedy High School =

John F. Kennedy High School or John F. Kennedy Catholic High School may refer to:

== Canada ==
- John F. Kennedy High School (Montreal), Quebec

== Germany ==
- John F. Kennedy School, Berlin, a primary and secondary school

== United States ==
- John F. Kennedy High School (Fremont, California)
- John F. Kennedy High School (Los Angeles), California
- John F. Kennedy High School (La Palma, California)
- John F. Kennedy High School (Richmond, California)
- John F. Kennedy High School (Sacramento, California)
- John F. Kennedy High School (Colorado), in Denver, Colorado
- John F. Kennedy High School (Connecticut), in Waterbury, Connecticut
- John F. Kennedy High School (Guam), in Tumon, Guam
- John F. Kennedy High School (Illinois), In Chicago, Illinois
- John F. Kennedy High School (Iowa), in Cedar Rapids, Iowa
- John F. Kennedy High School (Louisiana), in New Orleans, Louisiana
- John F. Kennedy High School (Maryland), in Montgomery County, Maryland
- John F. Kennedy High School (Michigan), in Taylor, Michigan (closed in 2018)
- John F. Kennedy Memorial High School (Mississippi), in Mound Bayou, Mississippi
- John F. Kennedy Catholic High School (Missouri), in Manchester, Missouri (closed in 2017)
- John F. Kennedy High School (Paterson, New Jersey)
- John F. Kennedy High School (Willingboro, New Jersey) (closed in 1989)
- John F. Kennedy Memorial High School (New Jersey), in Woodbridge Township, New Jersey
- John F. Kennedy High School (Bellmore, New York)
- Plainview–Old Bethpage John F. Kennedy High School in Plainview, New York
- John F. Kennedy High School (New York City), New York
- John F. Kennedy High School (Cheektowaga, New York)
- John F. Kennedy Catholic High School (Somers, New York)
- John F. Kennedy High School (Cleveland), Ohio
- John F. Kennedy High School (Warren, Ohio)
- John F. Kennedy High School (Oregon), in Mount Angel, Oregon
- John F. Kennedy High School (Texas), in San Antonio, Texas
- John F. Kennedy Catholic High School (Washington), in Burien, Washington

== See also ==
- Kennedy Catholic High School (disambiguation)
- Bloomington Kennedy High School, in Bloomington, Minnesota
- John F. Kennedy Preparatory High School (now The St. Nazianz Christian Center), in St. Nazianz, Wisconsin
- Robert F. Kennedy Community Schools Los Angeles, California
- Robert F. Kennedy Community High School Queens, New York
