= Lion's Choice =

American fast food restaurant chain

- Type: Corporation
- Industry: Restaurants
- Founded: 1967
- Founder: Marv Gibbs, Clint Tobias, and Arthur Morey
- Headquarters: St. Louis, Missouri, United States
- Area served: St. Louis metropolitan area, Kansas City metropolitan area (formerly)
- Key people: Mike Kupstas (CEO); Becky Fine (COO); Matt Barry (CFO)
- Products: Quick service restaurants, including: Roast beef · sandwiches
- Website: lionschoice.com

Red Lion Beef Corporation, doing business as Lion's Choice, is an American fast food restaurant chain based in St. Louis, Missouri, serving roast beef sandwiches and other menu items. The company was founded in 1952 and opened its first restaurant in Ballwin, Missouri, on October 26, 1967, which remains open today. As of May 2025, there are approximately 24 Lion's Choice restaurants in the St. Louis area.

In addition to roast beef sandwiches, Lion's Choice offers turkey sandwiches, ham sandwiches, Italian beef sandwiches, French dip sandwiches, hot dogs, soups, salads, side dishes, and desserts.

== History ==
Lion's Choice was founded in 1967 by Marv Gibbs, a graduate of Washington University in St. Louis who worked as a chemical engineer for Monsanto, Clint Tobias, and Arthur Morey. The first restaurant opened on October 26, 1967, in Ballwin, Missouri. The location served roast beef sandwiches, ham sandwiches, and turkey sandwiches for 69 cents each. The restaurant was originally named Brittany Beef but quickly changed to Red Lion Beef House. Two years later, Lion's Choice opened its second store in Creve Coeur, Missouri, and changed its name to Lion's Choice, after they could not trademark the name because the Red Lion name was already being used by Red Lion Hotels Corporation.

In 2013, the founders sold the company to Millstone Capital Advisors and BlackRock Holdings, equity groups led by St. Louis real estate developers Bob Millstone and Mark Disper, for an undisclosed amount. Under the new ownership, in 2015, Lion's Choice opened a restaurant in Ellisville, Missouri, its first in ten years.

In May 2017, Lion's Choice named Mike Kupstas, a longtime veteran of the foodservice industry, as its new CEO. Prior to this appointment, Kupstas held senior executive and marketing positions at Panera Bread, Long John Silver's and Red Lobster.

In September 2017, Lion's Choice launched its first food truck. The truck makes roast beef sandwiches, fries, and custard on board. In addition to other popular food-truck locations, the truck makes stops at Saint Louis University home soccer games and Scott Air Force Base.

In July 2018, Lion's Choice broke ground on two new locations in the Kansas City metropolitan area, which opened in November 2018. Three more locations opened in 2019. However, as of May 17, 2025, Lion's Choice has exited the Kansas City market, closing all locations.

== Products ==
=== Sandwiches ===
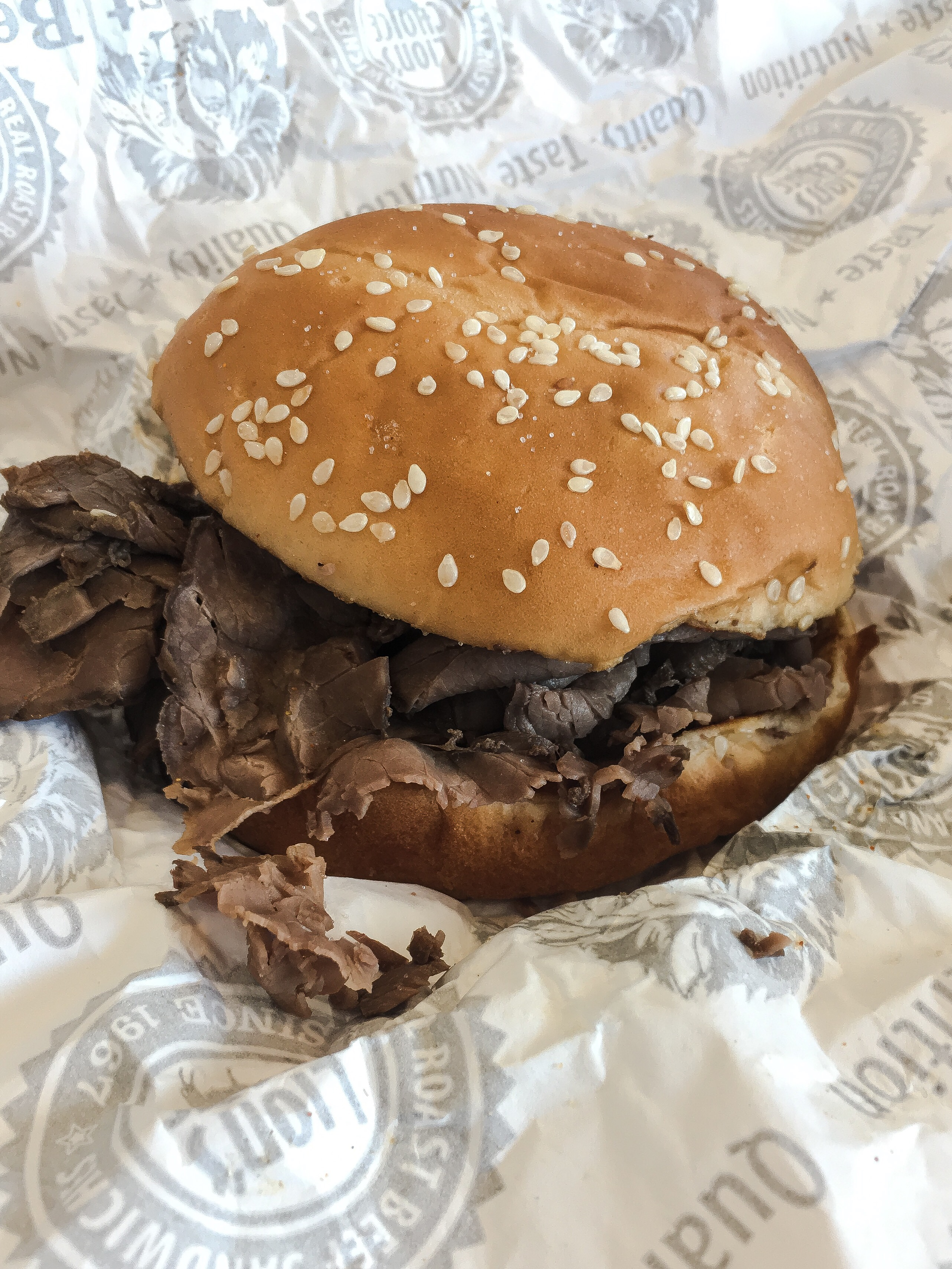
Original roast beef sandwich, cooked well done

Lion's Choice is known for selling roast beef sandwiches. The company describes the meat as "roasted beef" because of the amount of time the meat is prepared. The roast beef sandwich comes in three sizes: Original, Large and King (double the beef of Original). In addition to roast beef sandwiches, the menu includes hickory-smoked ham sandwiches, smokehouse pulled pork sandwiches, roasted turkey breast sandwiches, Italian beef sandwiches, and French dip. Lion's Choice also serves hot dogs.

=== Sides ===
As sides, Lion's Choice offers french fries, coleslaw, baked potatoes, and veggie sticks (carrots, celery sticks, broccoli florets, and grape tomatoes). The french fries are skin-on, gluten free, and without any added salt, and the baked potato can be loaded with any combination of the following: butter, chives, cheddar, bacon bits, broccoli, or chili.

=== Soups and salads ===
Lion's Choice offers a variety of soups and salads. Its salads include a side salad; "LC Seasonal", which has carrots, walnuts, dried cranberries, tomatoes and blue cheese topped with bistro dressing; "Butcher Block Cobb", which has roast beef, turkey and ham, paired with blue cheese, shredded cheddar, greens, tomatoes, and carrots topped with bistro dressing. In addition to seasonal/daily featured soups, Lion's Choice's soups include chicken noodle soup, cream of broccoli soup, and hearty chili (with roast beef).

=== Desserts ===
Lion's Choice serves frozen custard cones, which come in mini and regular sizes and can optionally be dipped in chocolate. The restaurant also serves milkshakes, cookies (chocolate chip, macadamia nut, or sugar), sundaes, root beer floats, and concretes.

== Awards ==
It was the Missouri state winner for the National Restaurant Association's Restaurant Neighbor Award in 2006. The restaurant chain was named Best Fast Food by the Riverfront Times in 2008. In 2014, the Riverfront Times named it the Best Chain Restaurant, and the St. Louis Post-Dispatch named it their Best Local Restaurant Chain.
