= Atiyyah Ellison =

American football player (born 1981)

No. 99
- Position: Defensive tackle

Personal information
- Born: September 29, 1981 (age 45); St. Louis, Missouri, U.S.
- Listed height: 6 ft 3 in (1.91 m)
- Listed weight: 315 lb (143 kg)

Career information
- High school: Parkway South (Manchester, Missouri)
- College: Missouri (2002-2004)
- NFL draft: 2005: 3rd round, 89th overall pick

Career history
- Carolina Panthers (2005); Houston Texans (2006)*; Baltimore Ravens (2006); San Francisco 49ers (2007–2008); Jacksonville Jaguars (2008–2009); Kansas City Chiefs (2010); New England Patriots (2010)
- * Offseason or practice squad member only

Awards and highlights
- First-team All-Big 12 (2004); Third-team All-Big 12 (2003)

Career NFL statistics
- Total tackles: 16
- Pass deflections: 1
- Stats at Pro Football Reference

Atiyyah Ramadan Ellison [ah-TEE-ah] (born September 29, 1981) is an American former professional football player who was a defensive tackle in the National Football League (NFL). He was selected by the Carolina Panthers in the third round of the 2005 NFL draft. He played college football for the Missouri Tigers.

Ellison was also a member of the Houston Texans, Baltimore Ravens, San Francisco 49ers, Jacksonville Jaguars, Kansas City Chiefs, and New England Patriots.

He now works at the University of Missouri in Columbia, Missouri as the Director of Player Development - Football.

== Early life ==
As a senior at Parkway South High School in St. Louis, Missouri, Ellison had three sacks and 47 tackles. He was ranked one of the top defensive lineman in the Midwest, won All-State honors, and was an All-Metro choice. Ellison also was a standout basketball player and received all-conference honors his senior year. He owns his high school shot put record and competed at the state track meet his junior and senior years.

Parkway South High School retired Ellison's jersey in 2006.

== College career ==
=== Coffeyville Community College ===
Ellison attended Coffeyville Community College in Coffeyville, Kansas, for two seasons, where he redshirted in 2000. As a freshman in 2001, Ellison started 9 of 10 games, recording 57 tackles and five sacks. Inducted into the Coffeyville Hall of Fame in 2016.

=== University of Missouri ===
After community college, Ellison attended the University of Missouri, where as a sophomore in 2002 he played in 12 games (9 starts), finishing with 39 tackles and two forced fumbles at defensive end. In 2003, Ellison earned third-team All-Big 12 Conference honors after recording 72 tackles, four sacks, and two forced fumbles. As a senior in 2004, Ellison played in 11 games, finishing with 60 tackles and 2.5 sacks, earning first-team All-Big 12 honors.

== Professional career ==
=== Carolina Panthers ===
Ellison was selected by the Carolina Panthers in the third round (89th overall) of the 2005 NFL draft. He was waived by Carolina during final cuts on September 3, 2005, and re-signed to their practice squad two days later. On September 14, 2005, he was promoted to the 53-man roster, but was waived again on September 24, 2005. He returned to the practice squad on September 27, 2005, and was elevated to the active roster again on October 31, 2005, where he spent the remainder of the season as an inactive. He was waived by the Panthers on September 2, 2006.

=== Houston Texans ===
The Houston Texans claimed Ellison off waivers on September 3, 2006, but waived him on September 7, 2006, before the start of the regular season.

=== Baltimore Ravens ===
Ellison was signed to the practice squad of the Baltimore Ravens on September 12, 2006, and was elevated to the 53-man roster on December 4, 2006. He was inactive for three games before being placed on injured reserve with a shoulder injury on December 30, 2006. He was waived by the Ravens on September 1, 2007, and re-signed to their practice squad the next day.

=== San Francisco 49ers ===
The San Francisco 49ers signed Ellison to their 53-man roster off the Ravens' practice squad on September 5, 2007. He was inactive for the entire 2007 season and was waived by the 49ers on August 30, 2008, and re-signed to the 49ers' practice squad the next day.

=== Jacksonville Jaguars ===
The Jacksonville Jaguars signed Ellison off the 49ers' practice squad on December 10, 2008, but he was inactive for the final three games of the regular season. Ellison made his NFL debut as a reserve in Week 1 of the 2009 season. He went on to play in 15 games for the Jaguars in 2009, starting nine at defensive tackle. He finished the season with 28 tackles and one and a half sack. He was waived by the Jaguars on September 4, 2010.

=== Kansas City Chiefs ===
The Kansas City Chiefs signed Ellison on October 20, 2010. He was inactive for one game before being waived on October 27, 2010.

=== New England Patriots ===
Ellison was signed by the New England Patriots on January 4, 2011, prior to their first playoff game. He was waived on January 8, 2011.
