= Grover, Missouri =

Neighborhood in Missouri, U.S.

- Neighborhood
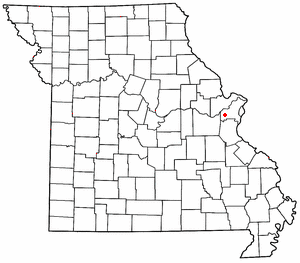

- Location within Missouri
- Country: United States
- State: Missouri
- County: St. Louis
- Township: Chesterfield and Wildhorse
- City: Wildwood
- Time zone: UTC−6 (Central (CST))
  - Summer (DST): UTC−5 (CDT)
- ZIP code: 63040
- Area code: 314

Grover was an unincorporated community in western St. Louis County, Missouri, United States. It was located on Old Manchester Road (part of the original alignment of U.S. Route 66), but has now been wholly incorporated into Wildwood, whose City Hall is located in old Grover.
