= Peerless Park, Missouri =

- Unincorporated community
- Location within Missouri
- Coordinates: 38°32′36″N 90°29′42″W
- Country: United States
- State: Missouri
- County: St. Louis
- Elevation: 446 ft (136 m)
- Time zone: UTC-6 (Central (CST))
  - Summer (DST): UTC-5 (CDT)
- ZIP code: 63088
- Area code: 636
- FIPS code: 29-56792
- GNIS feature ID: 756514

Peerless Park is a former, disincorporated town located at the junction of Interstate 44 and Route 141 in St. Louis County, Missouri, United States. It was incorporated in 1935 and by the 1980s, the majority of the town was businesses and its population did not exceed 50. At the request of its citizens, the town was disincorporated on May 1, 1998.

The former Peerless Park has since been annexed by the City of Valley Park.

== Demographics ==
Historical population
Census	Pop.	Note	%±
1940	47		—
1950	119		153.2%
1960	99		−16.8%
1970	51		−48.5%
1980	79		54.9%
1990	33		−58.2%
U.S. Decennial Census
