= Nora Baker =

Nora Baker may refer to:

- Noor Inayat Khan (1914–1944), British spy who used the alias Nora Baker
- Character played by Susan Sarandon in the film White Palace
