= Ballwin, Missouri =

City in St. Louis County, Missouri, United States

- City
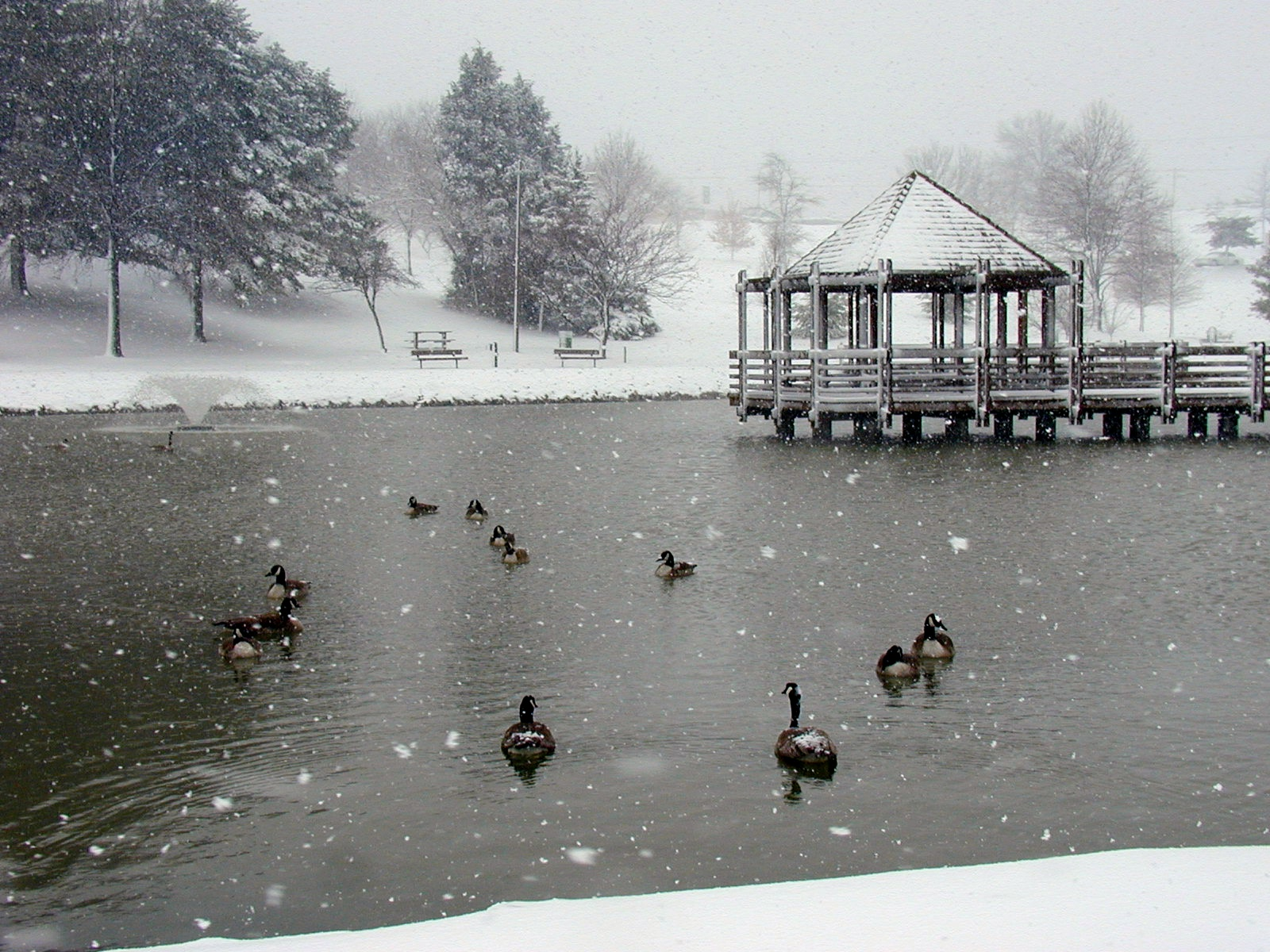
- Vlasis Park in Ballwin, Missouri, March 2000

- Flag

- Location of Ballwin in St. Louis County and Missouri

- Location in Missouri Ballwin (the United States) Ballwin (North America)
- Coordinates: 38°35′42″N 90°33′00″W
- Country: United States
- State: Missouri
- County: St. Louis
- Townships: Lafayette, Wildhorse, Meramec, Queeny, Missouri River
- Established: 1837
- Incorporated: December 29, 1950

Government
  - Mayor: Mark R. Stallmann

Area
  - Total: 8.98 sq mi (23.26 km^{2})
  - Land: 8.98 sq mi (23.26 km^{2})
  - Water: 0 sq mi (0.00 km^{2})
- Elevation: 623 ft (190 m)

Population (2020)
  - Total: 31,103
  - Density: 3,463.4/sq mi (1,337.21/km^{2})
- Time zone: UTC−6 (Central (CST))
  - Summer (DST): UTC−5 (CDT)
- FIPS code: 29-03160
- GNIS feature ID: 2394057
- Website: ballwin.mo.us

The old schoolhouse in Ballwin.

Ballwin is a western suburb of St. Louis in St. Louis County, Missouri, United States. Its population was 31,103 as of the 2020 census.

== History ==
Established in 1837, Ballwin was named for John Ball, who settled at the town site in 1804. A post office called Ballwin has been in operation since 1866.

== Geography ==
According to the United States Census Bureau, the city has a total area of 8.99 square miles (23.28 km^{2}), all land.

== Demographics ==
=== Racial and ethnic composition ===
Ballwin city, Missouri – Racial and ethnic composition Note: the US Census treats Hispanic/Latino as an ethnic category. This table excludes Latinos from the racial categories and assigns them to a separate category. Hispanics/Latinos may be of any race.
Race / Ethnicity (NH = Non-Hispanic)	Pop 2000	Pop 2010	Pop 2020	% 2000	% 2010	% 2020
White alone (NH)	28,844	26,670	24,974	92.20%	87.72%	80.29%
Black or African American alone (NH)	461	736	916	1.47%	2.42%	2.95%
Native American or Alaska Native alone (NH)	66	61	45	0.21%	0.20%	0.14%
Asian alone (NH)	1,017	1,703	2,730	3.25%	5.60%	8.78%
Native Hawaiian or Pacific Islander alone (NH)	11	8	8	0.04%	0.03%	0.03%
Other race alone (NH)	21	30	130	0.07%	0.10%	0.42%
Multiracial (NH)	280	463	1,327	0.90%	1.52%	4.27%
Hispanic or Latino (any race)	583	733	973	1.86%	2.41%	3.13%
Total	31,283	30,404	31,103	100.00%	100.00%	100.00%

=== 2020 census ===
As of the 2020 census, Ballwin had a population of 31,103. The median age was 41.9 years. 22.8% of residents were under the age of 18 and 18.9% of residents were 65 years of age or older. For every 100 females there were 94.2 males, and for every 100 females age 18 and over there were 91.8 males age 18 and over.

100.0% of residents lived in urban areas, while 0.0% lived in rural areas.

There were 12,212 households in Ballwin, of which 32.1% had children under the age of 18 living in them. Of all households, 59.7% were married-couple households, 12.8% were households with a male householder and no spouse or partner present, and 23.0% were households with a female householder and no spouse or partner present. About 23.4% of all households were made up of individuals and 11.2% had someone living alone who was 65 years of age or older.

There were 12,625 housing units, of which 3.3% were vacant. The homeowner vacancy rate was 0.8% and the rental vacancy rate was 4.9%.

Racial composition as of the 2020 census
Race	Number	Percent
White	25,231	81.1%
Black or African American	928	3.0%
American Indian and Alaska Native	64	0.2%
Asian	2,745	8.8%
Native Hawaiian and Other Pacific Islander	10	0.0%
Some other race	322	1.0%
Two or more races	1,803	5.8%
Hispanic or Latino (of any race)	973	3.1%

Historical population
Census	Pop.	Note	%±
1850	84		—
1880	159		—
1960	5,710		—
1970	10,656		86.6%
1980	12,656		18.8%
1990	21,816		72.4%
2000	31,283		43.4%
2010	30,404		−2.8%
2020	31,103		2.3%
U.S. Decennial Census

=== 2010 census ===
As of the 2010 census, 30,404 people, 11,874 households, and 8,631 families resided in the city. The population density was 3,382.0 inhabitants per square mile (1,305.8/km^{2}). The 12,435 housing units had an average density of 1,383.2 per square mile (534.1/km^{2}). The racial makeup of the city was 89.3% White, 2.5% African American, 0.2% Native American, 5.6% Asian, 0.6% from other races, and 1.7% from two or more races. Hispanic or Latino people of any race were 2.4% of the population.

Of the 11,874 households, 34.2% had children under 18 living with them, 60.9% were married couples living together, 15% had a female householder with no husband present, 3.0% had a male householder with no wife present, and 27.3% were not families. About 23.1% of all households were made up of individuals, and 9.4% had someone living alone who was 65 or older. The average household size was 2.56 and the average family size was 3.04.

The median age in the city was 41.2 years; the age distribution was 24.9% under 18, 6.8% from 18 to 24, 23.7% from 25 to 44; 29.5% from 45 to 64, and 15.1% were 65 years of age or older. The gender makeup of the city was 48.2% male and 51.8% female.

=== 2000 census ===
As of the census of 2000, 31,283 people, 11,797 households, and 8,942 families were living in the city. The population density was 3,494.6 inhabitants per square mile (1,349.3/km^{2}). The 12,062 housing units had an average density of 1,347.4 per square mile (520.2/km^{2}). The racial makeup of the city was 75.39% White, 10.50% African American, 0.22% Native American, 5.27% Asian, 0.04% Pacific Islander, 0.51% from other races, and 1.07% from two or more races.

Of the 11,797 households, 37.2% had children under 18 living with them, 65.6% were married couples living together, 8.0% had a female householder with no husband present, and 24.2% were not families. Around 20.6% of all households were made up of individuals, and 7.3% had someone living alone who was 65 or older. The average household size was 2.65 and the average family size was 3.09.

In the city, the age distribution was 27.0% under 18, 6.4% from 18 to 24, 29.9% from 25 to 44, 24.5% from 45 to 64, and 12.1% who were 65 or older. The median age was 38 years. For every 100 females, there were 94.2 males. For every 100 females 18 and over, there were 91.6 males.

The median income for a household in the city was $66,458 and for a family was $77,021 (these figures had risen to $76,931 and $94,989, respectively, as of a 2007 estimate). Males had a median income of $56,056 versus $32,202 for females. The per capita income for the city was $29,520. About 2.0% of families and 3.2% of the population were below the poverty line, including 3.1% of those under 18 and 3.7% of those 65 or over.

== Education ==
Ballwin is home to many schools within the Parkway School District, including Parkway West High School, and Claymont, Henry, Oak Brook, and Sorrento Springs elementary schools.

Ballwin also contains several schools within the Rockwood School District, including Selvidge Middle School, Ballwin, Westridge, and Woerther elementary schools.

Holy Infant School is a Catholic private school in Ballwin that includes Pre-K through Eighth Grade.

== Business ==
Lion's Choice, a roast beef fast-food chain, was founded in Ballwin.

== Religion ==
Several churches, mosques, and synagogues exist in the city.

Salem in Ballwin United Methodist Church is located along Manchester Road, in the heart of Ballwin. The church was founded in 1846 by Brother H. Hohmann, a German immigrant involved with the German Methodist Episcopal Church. The original church was built in 1870, and traditional Methodist services are still conducted each Sunday inside. During 21st century renovations, a sign was discovered within the church that is thought to have hung within the original 1870 church, which reads: "ehre sei gott in der höhe," meaning "Glory to God in the highest." The sign was once again hung up in the church and can be found at the rear of the sanctuary. The church is involved in assisting an orphanage located in South Africa.

== Parks and recreation ==
Vlasis Park is the largest park in Ballwin. It is located north of Manchester Road between Seven Trails Dr., Ball Park Drive, and Holloway Road. Vlasis Park covers 31 acres and features a baseball diamond, a playground, four tennis courts, restrooms, two ponds (one of which is stocked with fish), two pavilions, a walking path, and a sand volleyball court. Vlasis Park is the location of the annual Ballwin Days Festival. The park is also home to the Harrison-Schmidt-Dahlke Log House.

Ballwin is also home to New Ballwin Park, Ferris Park, Greenfield Commons, and Holloway Park.

The Pointe at Ballwin Commons hosts an indoor pool and fitness center. The North Pointe Aquatic Center is an outdoor pool open only during the summer. Adjacent to the North Pointe is the Ballwin Golf Course.

Ballwin is home to Bacon Log Cabin, a museum of local history.

== Notable people ==
- Blaine Gabbert, former NFL Quarterback
- Jansen Miller, professional soccer player for Sporting Kansas City
- George Gray (television personality), announcer for The Price is Right
- Ann Wagner, U.S. representative, former U.S. ambassador to Luxembourg, co-chair of the Republican National Committee and chairwoman of the Missouri Republican Party
- Pat Noonan, head coach of FC Cincinnati
- Timothy Dolan, former archbishop of the Archdiocese of New York and current Cardinal (Catholic Church)

== See also ==
- List of cities in Missouri
