= Parkway Central High School =

American high school in Missouri

Location
- 369 North Woods Mill Road; Chesterfield, Missouri 63017; United States; 38°39′52″N 90°30′16″W

Information
- Type: Public high school
- Established: 1954; 72 years ago
- School district: Parkway School District
- Principal: Tim McCarthy
- Teaching staff: 83.24 (FTE)
- Enrollment: 1,261 (2023–24)
- Student to teacher ratio: 15.15
- Colors: Red, black, and white
- Athletics conference: Suburban Conference
- Nickname: Colts
- Newspaper: Corral
- Website: centralhigh.parkwayschools.net

Parkway Central High School is a public high school in Chesterfield, Missouri. It is part of the Parkway School District.

== History ==
Five elementary school districts merged to form the Parkway Consolidated School District. The name for the district was proposed by a fourth grader from Barretts Elementary School. The name "Parkway" was in honor of the Daniel Boone Parkway, which is also known as Highway 40 (now I-64). The road passes through the center of the district. The word Consolidated was later dropped as sounding too rural in the rapidly growing and changing district.

Parkway Central was the first high school built in the new district. The original high school was converted to a junior high school when the present high school was built in 1961. There are now a total of five high schools in the district (Central, North, West, South, and Fern Ridge).

In September 2021, several hundred students walked out of class after racist graffiti was found at the school. Students walked to the school's administrative building, and chanted "no justice, no peace". The school later disclosed that a black student had written the graffiti. The school's superintendent wrote a letter to the community saying the student's race "does not diminish the hurt it caused or the negative impact it has on our entire community".

== Activities ==
For the 2011–12 school year, the school offered 27 activities approved by the Missouri State High School Activities Association (MSHSAA): baseball, boys and girls basketball, cheerleading, boys and girls cross country, dance team, football, boys and girls golf, girls lacrosse, music activities, scholar bowl, boys and girls soccer, softball, speech and debate, boys and girls swimming and diving, boys and girls tennis, boys and girls track and field, boys and girls volleyball, water polo, and wrestling. The school does not sponsor a boys ice hockey club. The school newspaper is the Corral, which is a member of the High School National Ad Network. There is a marching band, the "Parkway Central Marching Colts" that plays at football games in the fall as well as marching competitions. The band students then play in either a concert or symphonic band after football season ends. The concert band is available during football season as well for those who can not or would prefer not to march.

== Notable alumni ==
- Michael Avenatti '89, attorney and convicted felon
- Gary Barnett '64, former head football coach at the University of Colorado and Northwestern University
- Michael Block '94, PGA club pro who had a Tin Cup hole in one on the 15th during the final round of the 2023 PGA Championship
- Isaac Byrd '93, former wide receiver for the Tennessee Titans and Carolina Panthers
- Bob Clark, businessman and civic leader
- Brad Cohen '92, Author/Motivational Speaker, "Front of the Class - How Tourette Syndrome made me the teacher I never had"
- Preston Elliot (Preston Wilson) '86, co-host of the Preston & Steve show on WMMR
- Mark Fauser '79, film and television writer
- Bryan Greenberg '96, actor
- Joel Higgins '62, actor
- James Kerwin '91, film director
- Mark Lemley '84, William H. Neukom Professor of Law at Stanford Law School
- Amber Lyon '01, three-time Emmy Award-winning investigative journalist and former CNN investigative reporter.
- Trista Rehn '91, reality television show star, The Bachelorette
- Damon Rich '93, artist and architect, founder of the Center for Urban Pedagogy (CUP) and 2017 MacArthur Fellow
- Khalen Saunders '14, NFL player and Super Bowl Champion.
- Glenn Savan '71, author of the book which was the basis of the movie White Palace
- Max Scherzer '03, starting pitcher for the Texas Rangers, Cy Young Award winner
- Dave Silvestri ’85, Former MLB player (New York Yankees, Montreal Expos, Texas Rangers, Tampa Bay Rays, Anaheim Angels)
- Ryan Young '94, former offensive tackle for the New York Jets and Houston Texans
