= Valley Park High School =

Public high school in Valley Park, Missouri, US

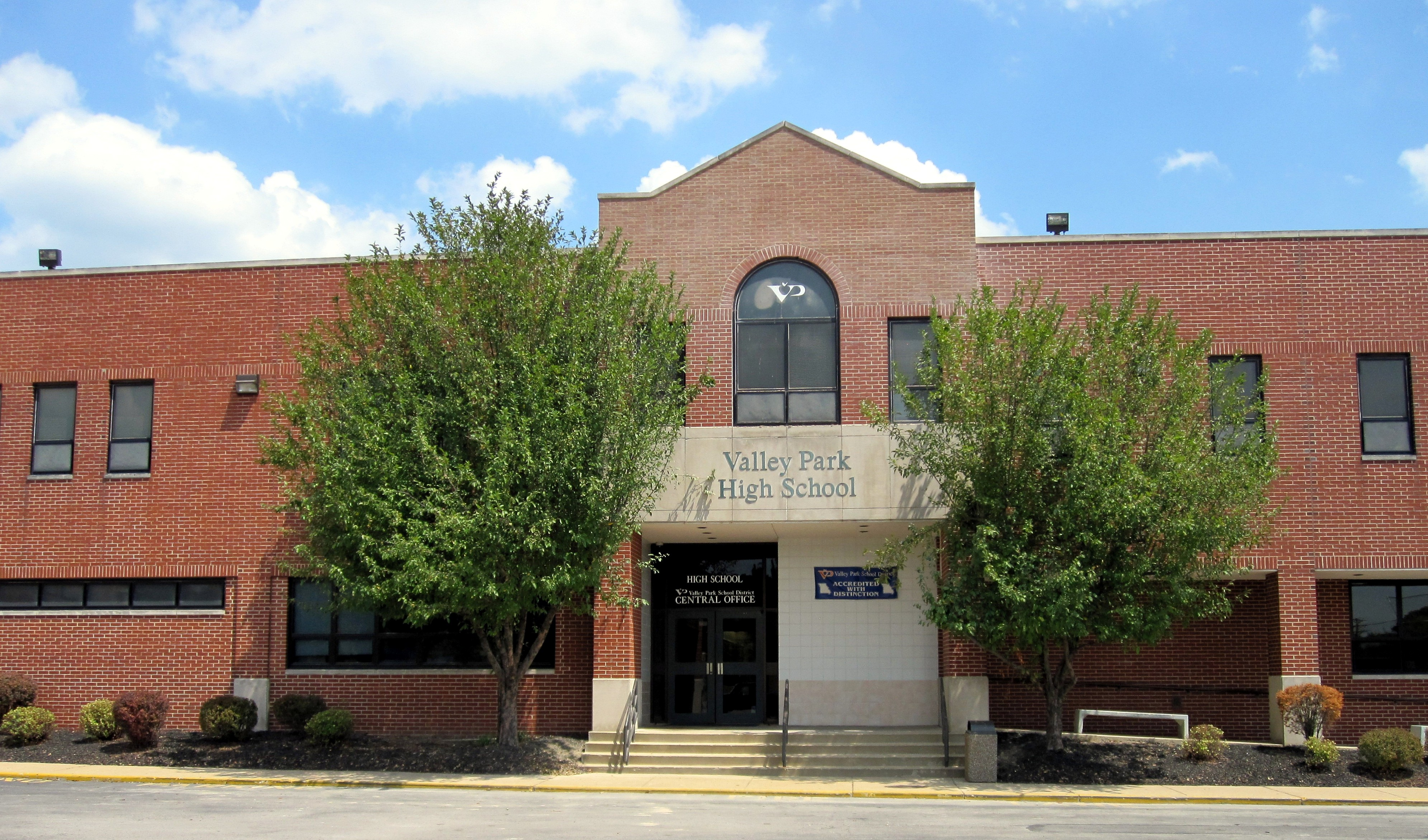

Location
- One Main Street; Valley Park, Missouri 63088; United States; 38°33′09″N 90°29′41″W

Information
- Type: Public high school
- Established: September 6, 1932; 93 years ago
- School district: Valley Park School District
- NCES School ID: 293069002116
- Principal: Ryan Luhning
- Teaching staff: 21.88 (FTE)
- Grades: 9–12
- Enrollment: 230 (2024–2025)
- Colors: Orange and blue
- Athletics conference: South Central Activities Association
- Nickname: Hawks
- Feeder schools: Valley Park Middle
- Website: vpschools.org/o/vphs

Valley Park High School is a public high school in Valley Park, Missouri, United States. It is a part of the Valley Park School District.

The school district (of which this is the sole comprehensive high school) includes the majority of Valley Park, the majority of the village of Twin Oaks, and a portion of Manchester..

== History ==
Valley Park High School opened on September 6, 1932, and graduated its first class in 1934. Since then, Valley Park has remained the only public high school in the area

== Academics ==
The average ACT is 20.6. There are approximately 21 teachers giving the school a student-teacher ratio of 13:1. 95% of students graduate on time and 78% go to college. Valley Park High is ranked 15th in Missouri in education. VPH has won several awards for academic achievement such as:

- 2012 National Blue Ribbon School Award
- 2012 Missouri Gold Star School

== Demographics ==
The Demographics of the high school in the 2016–2017 school year was as follows:

White	African American	Asian American	Latino	Two or More Races
61%	26%	3%	6%	4%
