= Kennedy Catholic High School =

Kennedy Catholic High School may refer to:

- John F. Kennedy Catholic High School (Burien, Washington)
- John F. Kennedy Catholic High School (Somers, New York)
- John F. Kennedy Catholic High School (Manchester, Missouri)
- Kennedy Catholic High School (Hermitage, Pennsylvania)

See also:

- John F Kennedy Catholic School
- John F. Kennedy High School (disambiguation)
- Kennedy-Kenrick Catholic High School, in Norristown, Pennsylvania
