= Bacon Log Cabin =

Historic log cabin in Ballwin, Missouri

- Location: Ballwin, Missouri
- Coordinates: 38.608670°N 90.519600°W
- Type: Historical log cabin
- Owner: Old Trails Historical Society
- Website: oldtrailshistoricalsociety.com

The Bacon Log Cabin is a historical log cabin and local history museum in Ballwin, Missouri. The property is named for the Bacon family, who occupied the property from 1835 to 1889. Today, the cabin serves as a local history museum.

== History ==
The Bacon Log Cabin dates back to as early as the 1820s, built by William Bacon and named for his grandson William Douglas Bacon. It was built similar to 3 conjoined cabins, on 700 acres of farmland. The Bacon farm stretched along both sides of Henry Avenue and Woods Mill Road south of Clayton Road. All the logs used in the cabin had been cut down in areas close to the cabin, as the cabin was situated in a forested location. All the bricks used in the cabin were handmade and plastered with local materials from Samuel Berry's Brick Company which was opened in 1822 in the village of Manchester, Missouri.

In the late 1820s, William Bacon intended to build a cabin for his grandson, William Douglas Bacon. The homestead he envisioned was 4 room and 2-story, with suitable comfort and plenty of living space. The house took many years to build and had fireplaces on both levels, a kitchen for the family cook, and several other luxurious features.

The original plastering of the Bacon Log Cabin had an intentional heating purpose. The cabin was built two stories tall and in a forested area, which would lead to heating difficulties, especially with the materials and technology at hand in the early 1800s. The architect followed the design of the Swiss architect Spernelli, along with plastering techniques and a fireplace to entrap heat, in a moderate climate.

The Bacon family occupied the house until 1889, when it was sold to another family. In 1932, the house was reduced to its current size.

In 1969, Bacon Log Cabin was acquired by Old Trails Historical Society and converted to an admission-by-donation museum. The museum is paid for by St. Louis County, Missouri and has hosted tours year round for about half a century.

== Original cabin ==
When the Bacon Log Cabin was originally built in Ballwin, Missouri, it consisted of common building materials of the time, such as logs, plastering, and handmade bricks. The home (before being resized) was created as three conjoined cabins. The Bacon Log Cabin was a 2-story home with 4 large rooms and an upstairs area for the family cook.

== Historic landmark ==
The Bacon Log Cabin is one of St. Louis' many historic landmarks, alongside the Cupples House and the Ambassador Theatre (St. Louis). It was built as housing, just after Missouri became a state. It was situated on a farm more than 700 acres in size.
