= Bruce Kershner =

American environmentalist (1950–2007)

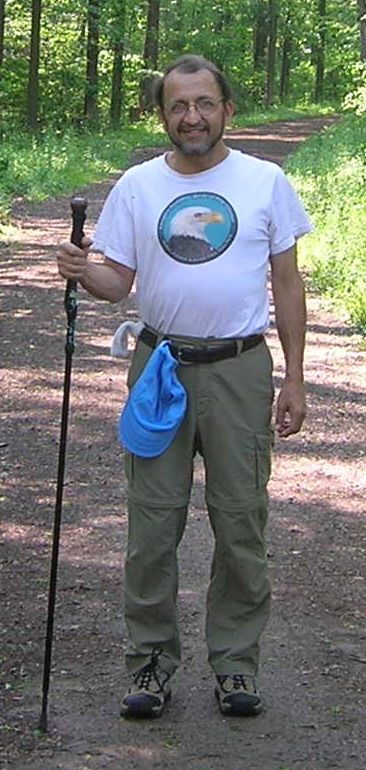
Bruce Kershner at Buckhorn Island State Park

Bruce S. Kershner (April 17, 1950 – February 16, 2007) was an American environmentalist, author, high school biology teacher and forest ecologist.

== Life ==
As a child he resided in Staten Island. Bruce Kershner obtained degrees from Binghamton University and the University of Connecticut. He most recently resided in Amherst with his wife Helene. He taught high school biology at John F. Kennedy High School in Cheektowaga, New York, until 2005 where he established the Environmental Club, exposing many of his students to the old grown forests he cared so much about.

He was a renowned old-growth forest authority, and has rediscovered almost 300 old growth forests in Eastern North America previously assumed lost. These include the second tallest hardwood forest in Eastern North America, outside of the southern Appalachians, New York State's oldest forest, and the largest assemblage of old growth (the Niagara River corridor). Kershner has published a dozen books including the Sierra Club Guide to Ancient Forests of the Northeast and Secret Places: Scenic Treasures of Western New York and Southern Ontario.

Bruce Kershner has won numerous awards for his environmental activism. These include 'Environmentalist of the Year' in 1987 and 1988 from the Sierra Club (Niagara Group) and the Adirondack Mountain Club, and 'Environmentalist of the Year in New York State' in 1996 from Environmental Advocates of New York. Bruce Kershner was serving as the Conservation Chair for the Buffalo Audubon Society.

Bruce Kershner led numerous ecological studies. These have included studies of the Reinstein Woods Nature Preserve, Zoar Valley, Staten Island, Allegany State Park, and the Niagara Gorge. He was working on a research study for legal proceedings associated with the Kortright Hills Community Association in Guelph, Ontario.

Kershner died in February 2007, after battling esophageal cancer for a year and a half.

== Legacy ==
Effective September 4, 2008, New York State Governor David Patterson signed into law the Bruce S. Kershner Old-growth Forest Preservation and Protection Act, an amendment to existing environmental law that establishes a first in the nation definition of an Old Growth Forest, compels indefinite protection on state land and encourages acquisition by the state where the definition is satisfied on private land.

== Bruce Kershner Award ==
Since at least 2009, the Niagara Group of the Sierra Club has presented the annual Bruce Kershner Award to an individual or individuals for their environmental activism. The award was "designed to honor a person who has continued to fight tirelessly on behalf of an environmental issue in the way that Kershner fought for old growth forests." Recipients have included:

- 2016—Paul Dyster, Thomas DeSantis, and Bob Baxter for "their work on the restoration of the magnificent Niagara Gorge and the removal of the Robert Moses Parkway."
- 2015—Charley Bowman for "Leadership in working with many climate change issues and his concerns for justice and peace being central to the mission of climate justice."
- 2014—Jay Burney for "Leadership in preserving the natural heritage of our region especially for his work on Times Beach Nature Preserve."
- 2013—Dr. David Kowalski for "his ongoing and evidence-based critique of the proposed deep horizontal hydrofracking" and for "creat[ing] Re-energize Buffalo a website dedicated to the viability of renewable energy, a clean environment, and preserving public health"
- 2012—Walter & Nan Simpson for their work in supporting renewable and clean energy
- 2011—Bill Nowak for "promoting green jobs and renewable energy and for his service to New York as former legislative aide"
- 2010—Margaret Wooster for her work as an "author and [as] former Executive Director of Great Lakes United"
- 2009—Daniel Ward for his service on the Town of Amherst Board

== Bibliography (selected) ==
- Buffalo's Backyard Wilderness: An Ecological Study of the Dr. Victor Reinstein Woods State Nature Preserve (1993)
- Secret Places of Western New York (1994)
- Secret Places of Staten Island (1998)
- Cascades, Cataracts, and Chasms: A Guide to the Waterfalls of Western New York and Nearby Ontario (1998)
- Guide to the Ancient Forests of Zoar Valley Canyon (2000)
- The Sierra Club Guide to the Ancient Forests of the Northeast (2004)
