= Parkway South High School =

American high school in Machester, Missouri

Location
- 801 Hanna Road; Manchester, Missouri 63021; United States; 38°34′38″N 90°30′44″W

Information
- Type: Public high school
- Established: 1976; 50 years ago
- School district: Parkway School District
- NCES School ID: 292358001394
- Principal: Greg Wagener
- Teaching staff: 102.13 (on an FTE basis)
- Grades: 9–12
- Enrollment: 1,485 (2024–25)
- Student to teacher ratio: 14.54
- Colors: Red, white, and blue
- Athletics conference: Suburban Conference
- Nickname: Patriots
- Website: southhigh.parkwayschools.net

Parkway South High School is a public comprehensive high school in Manchester, Missouri, United States. It is part of the Parkway School District.

== History ==
Parkway South High School opened in 1976, the bicentennial of the United States Declaration of Independence. For this reason, the school mascot is the Patriot and the colors are red, white, and blue.

Since starting a renovation in 2010, the school has built a new science wing, implemented new technology in every classroom, installed turf, renovated its main gym, installed new tennis courts, and is working on a new men's locker room.

== Athletics ==
Parkway South is a full member of the Missouri State High School Activities Association (MSHSAA), where they compete as the Patriots. The school has won 9 MSHSAA state titles across 4 different sports.

- Boys' golf (1): 2001
- Softball (3): 1989, 1991, 1995
- Boys' swimming and diving (3): 1999, 2000, 2001
- Girls' swimming and diving (2): 2022, 2023

== Notable alumni ==
- Atiyyah Ellison, former NFL player
- Ray Everett, author
- Sarah Haskins, 2008 Olympic triathlete
- Scott Langley, professional golfer
- Mike McKenna, former NHL hockey player
- Greg Raymer, 2004 World Series of Poker Main Event champion
- Cara Spencer, 48th mayor of St. Louis
