= Jay Marshall (baseball) =

American baseball player (born 1983)

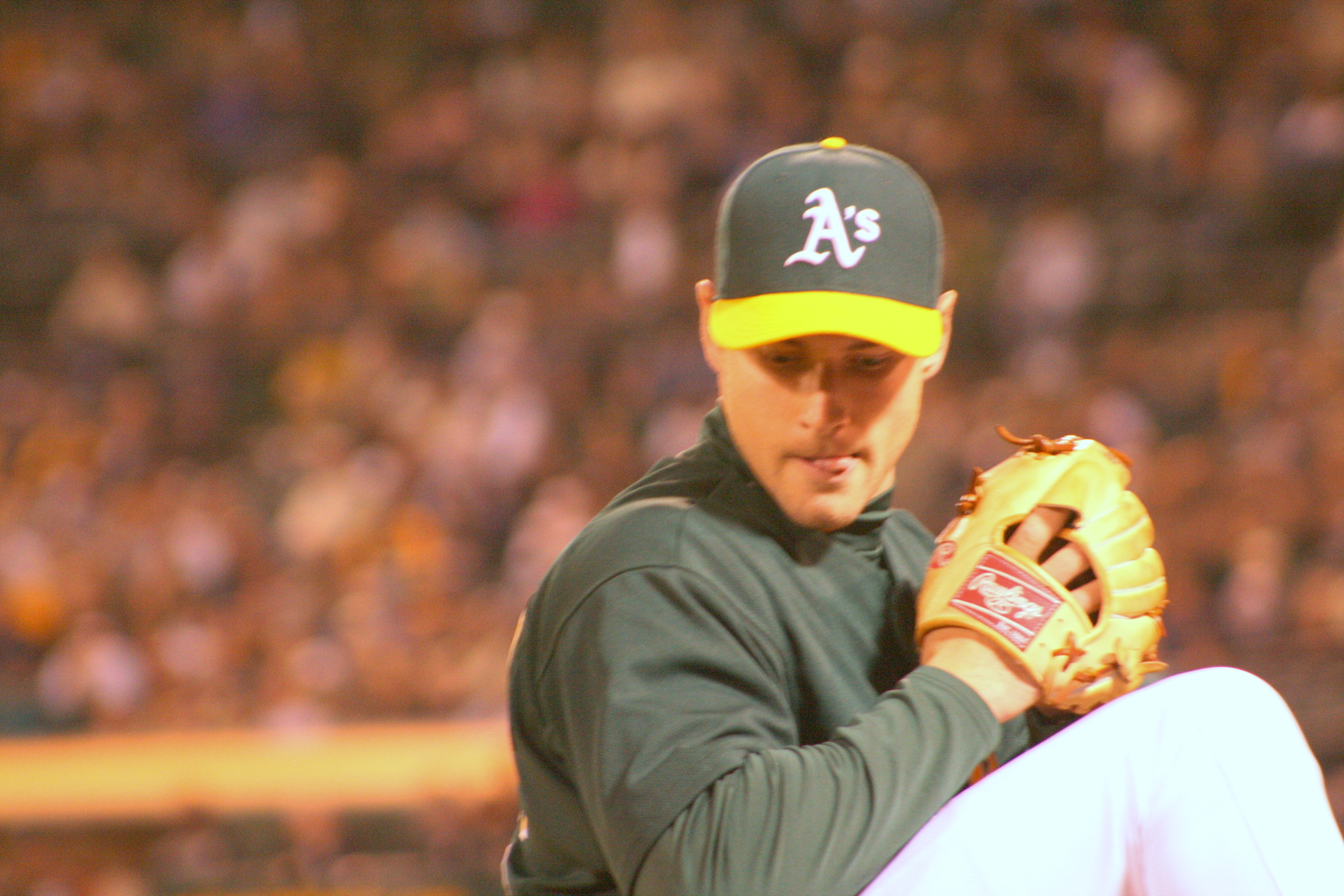
- Marshall with the Oakland Athletics
- Pitcher
- Born: February 25, 1983 (age 43); St. Louis, Missouri, U.S.
- Batted: Left Threw: Left

MLB debut
- April 2, 2007, for the Oakland Athletics

Last MLB appearance
- September 1, 2009, for the Oakland Athletics

MLB statistics
- Win–loss record: 1–4
- Earned run average: 7.66
- Strikeouts: 19
- Stats at Baseball Reference

Teams
- Oakland Athletics (2007, 2009)

Jay William Marshall (born February 25, 1983) is an American former professional baseball relief pitcher. He played in Major League Baseball with the Oakland Athletics in 2007 and 2009.

Marshall grew up in St. Louis. He is the son of Rich and Debby Marshall. He graduated from John F. Kennedy Catholic High School (Manchester, Missouri) in 2001. He played against future St Louis Cardinals legend David Freese for his first 3 years. Then the two of them played for an age-11 tournament team that went to Tokyo, Japan to play in an international tournament. David was named the outstanding pitcher in that tournament.

== Early career ==
Marshall was selected by the Chicago White Sox in the 25th round (750th overall) in the 2002 Major League Baseball draft. However, he did not sign with the White Sox until next year on May 25, 2003. He played for the White Sox Rookie League team for 3 years from 2003 to 2005 before finally playing in Single-A for the Winston-Salem Warthogs in 2006.

He went 5–1 with 1.02 ERA in 2006 for the Warthogs.

== Professional career ==
=== Oakland Athletics ===
On December 7, 2006, Marshall was selected by the Oakland Athletics in the Rule 5 draft. He was impressive for the Athletics during Spring Training in 2007, the first time he had been invited to Major League Spring Training. He went 1–0 with a 2.76 ERA in 12 games and made the Opening Day roster despite never playing above Single-A ball.

He made his major league debut on April 2, 2007, and won his only Major League game on April 15 against the New York Yankees, beating future Hall of Fame closer Mariano Rivera when Marco Scutaro hit a three-run home run in the bottom of the ninth inning.

Marshall finished the 2007 season with a 1–2 record and a 6.43 ERA in 51 games. He retired the first 12 batters he faced over the first 4 games of his Major League career.

Following the season, on October 15, Marshall was claimed off waivers by the Boston Red Sox. On December 6, 2007, Marshall was reclaimed by the Oakland Athletics. On December 11, 2007, Marshall was outrighted to the minor leagues to Triple-A Sacramento. Marshall did not pitch in the majors during the 2008 season and made 10 appearances in the 2009 season, going 0–2 with an ERA of 14.73 in 7.1 innings.

On December 30, 2009, Marshall was designated for assignment by the Oakland Athletics to make room on the roster for Justin Duchscherer.

=== New York Mets ===
On January 8, 2010, Marshall was claimed off waivers by the New York Mets. On March 9, 2010, he was returned to the Oakland Athletics after the waiver claim was voided by the commissioner's office due to a pre-existing shoulder injury. The Athletics immediately released him.

== Pitching Style ==
He pitches with a submarine delivery.
