= Fern Ridge High School =

High school in Creve Coeur, Missouri, US

Location
- 13157 N. Olive Spur Road; Creve Coeur, Missouri 63141; United States; 38°41′02″N 90°29′12″W

Information
- Type: Public alternative high school
- Established: 1992; 34 years ago
- School district: Parkway School District
- NCES School ID: 292358000459
- Principal: Michael Maclin
- Faculty: 11
- Enrollment: 90
- Website: fernridge.parkwayschools.net

Fern Ridge High School is a public alternative high school in Creve Coeur, Missouri that is part of the Parkway School District.
