= Valley Park School District =

School district in Missouri, United States

Address
- 1 Main Street Valley Park, Missouri, 63088; United States

District information
- Established: 1882; 144 years ago
- Superintendent: Tim Dilg
- Schools: 4
- Budget: $5,379,777 (As of 2021)
- NCES District ID: 2930690

Students and staff
- Students: 871 (As of 2020)
- Teachers: 80 (As of 2020)
- Staff: 66 (As of 2020)

Other information
- Website: vpschools.org

Valley Park School District is a K-12 Public School District in St. Louis County, Missouri. It includes the majority of Valley Park, the majority of the village of Twin Oaks, and a portion of Manchester.

== History ==
VPSD started in 1882 with the founding of Hill School, the district's first elementary school, This school was located several blocks north of the present campus and was closed by 1931. Benton school was the second school to open in 1908, named after Thomas Hart Benton but later closed in 1954. Valley Park High School opened its doors on September 6, 1932, and continues to be the only operating public high school in Valley Park. VPSD currently encomposes 4.6 square miles (12 km^{2}).

== About ==
The Valley Park School District is a rather small, but growing district. The early childhood development center, elementary, middle, and high school are all on one campus. It became the nucleus of the present school district campus.

== Awards ==
Valley Park School District has received multiple academic- and athletic-related recognitions in the last decade. These awards include the Federal Blue Ribbon, which some educators equate to the Super Bowl of academics. Shortly after earning the prestigious Federal Blue Ribbon, the high school was ranked in the top 15 high schools in the state of Missouri by US News and & World Report , making it mathematically in the top 2% of public high schools in the state of Missouri. The ranking was based on test scores in Algebra and Communication Arts, Advanced Placement (AP) tests, and student/teacher ratio. These and other awards are listed below:

- District received the Distinction in Performance Award by the State of Missouri, with a perfect score for six consecutive years, 2007–2012.
- Valley Park High School received the 2012 Missouri Gold Star School and the 2012 National Blue Ribbon Schools Award.
- Valley Park Middle School is a Missouri and a National School of Character.
- Valley Park High School has been recognized nationally by U.S. News & World Report and Newsweek magazine, including its ranking of #15 in the state of Missouri in 2018.
- In 2016, U.S. News & World Report's 'Beating the Odds' list ranked Valley Park High School 69th nationally and no. 1 in Missouri at sending low-income students to college.

VPSD in the 2016–2017 school year had 68 teachers and 6 administrators. The district boats an on-time graduation rate of 95%, with 78% of their students going to college after high school. The average ACT was 20.6, which is close to the Missouri average of 20.8.

== Schools ==
=== Pre-K ===
- Dennis Lea Early Childhood Center

=== Elementary ===
- Valley Park Elementary

=== Middle ===
- Valley Park Middle

=== High ===
- Valley Park High School
