= Twin Oaks, Missouri =

- City
- Location of Twin Oaks, Missouri
- Coordinates: 38°34′0″N 90°30′2″W
- Country: United States
- State: Missouri
- County: St. Louis
- Incorporated: May 1938

Area
  - Total: 0.27 sq mi (0.70 km^{2})
  - Land: 0.27 sq mi (0.70 km^{2})
  - Water: 0 sq mi (0.00 km^{2})
- Elevation: 564 ft (172 m)

Population (2020)
  - Total: 605
  - Density: 2,246.6/sq mi (867.43/km^{2})
- Time zone: UTC-6 (Central (CST))
  - Summer (DST): UTC-5 (CDT)
- FIPS code: 29-74284
- GNIS feature ID: 2400012
- Website: www.cityoftwinoaks.gov

Twin Oaks is a 4th class city in St. Louis County, Missouri, United States. The former Village of Twin Oaks changed its status to that of a city by public election in November 2016. The population was 392 at the 2010 census.

== Geography ==
According to the United States Census Bureau, the village has a total area of 0.27 square miles (0.70 km^{2}), all land.

== Demographics ==
Historical population
Census	Pop.	Note	%±
1940	65		—
1950	81		24.6%
1960	206		154.3%
1970	41		−80.1%
1980	426		939.0%
1990	506		18.8%
2000	362		−28.5%
2010	392		8.3%
2020	605		54.3%
U.S. Decennial Census

=== 2020 census ===
Twin Oaks city, Missouri – Racial and ethnic composition Note: the US Census treats Hispanic/Latino as an ethnic category. This table excludes Latinos from the racial categories and assigns them to a separate category. Hispanics/Latinos may be of any race.
Race / Ethnicity (NH = Non-Hispanic)	Pop 2000	Pop 2010	Pop 2020	% 2000	% 2010	% 2020
White alone (NH)	355	380	527	98.07%	96.94%	87.11%
Black or African American alone (NH)	1	3	12	0.28%	0.77%	1.98%
Native American or Alaska Native alone (NH)	0	0	1	0.00%	0.00%	0.17%
Asian alone (NH)	4	2	22	1.10%	0.51%	3.64%
Native Hawaiian or Pacific Islander alone (NH)	0	0	0	0.00%	0.00%	0.00%
Other race alone (NH)	0	0	1	0.00%	0.00%	0.17%
Mixed race or Multiracial (NH)	0	3	27	0.00%	0.77%	4.46%
Hispanic or Latino (any race)	2	4	15	0.55%	1.02%	2.48%
Total	362	392	605	100.00%	100.00%	100.00%

=== 2010 census ===
As of the census of 2010, there were 392 people, 177 households, and 107 families living in the village. The population density was 1,451.9 inhabitants per square mile (560.6/km^{2}). There were 182 housing units at an average density of 674.1 per square mile (260.3/km^{2}). The racial makeup of the village was 97.4% White, 0.8% African American, 0.5% Asian, 0.5% from other races, and 0.8% from two or more races. Hispanic or Latino of any race were 1.0% of the population.

There were 177 households, of which 19.2% had children under the age of 18 living with them, 51.4% were married couples living together, 5.6% had a female householder with no husband present, 3.4% had a male householder with no wife present, and 39.5% were non-families. 33.3% of all households were made up of individuals, and 12.4% had someone living alone who was 65 years of age or older. The average household size was 2.21 and the average family size was 2.80.

The median age in the village was 49 years. 14.3% of residents were under the age of 18; 7.6% were between the ages of 18 and 24; 21.4% were from 25 to 44; 35.4% were from 45 to 64; and 21.2% were 65 years of age or older. The gender makeup of the village was 50.3% male and 49.7% female.

=== 2000 census ===
As of the census of 2000, there were 362 people, 166 households, and 111 families living in the village. The population density was 1,403.8 inhabitants per square mile (542.0/km^{2}). There were 167 housing units at an average density of 647.6 per square mile (250.0/km^{2}). The racial makeup of the village was 98.62% White, 0.28% African American and, 1.10% Asian. Hispanic or Latino of any race were 0.55% of the population.

There were 166 households, out of which 21.1% had children under the age of 18 living with them, 57.8% were married couples living together, 8.4% had a female householder with no husband present, and 33.1% were non-families. 28.9% of all households were made up of individuals, and 10.2% had someone living alone who was 65 years of age or older. The average household size was 2.18 and the average family size was 2.69.

In the village, the population was spread out, with 14.6% under the age of 18, 6.6% from 18 to 24, 26.8% from 25 to 44, 32.6% from 45 to 64, and 19.3% who were 65 years of age or older. The median age was 46 years. For every 100 females, there were 90.5 males. For every 100 females aged 18 and over, there were 89.6 males.

The median income for a household in the village was $62,778, and the median income for a family was $68,125. Males had a median income of $53,750 versus $35,000 for females. The per capita income for the village was $33,316. None of the families and 1.7% of the population were living below the poverty line, including no under eighteens and 2.9% of those over 64.

== Education ==
St. Louis County Library Grand Glaize Branch is in Manchester, adjacent to Twin Oaks.

Valley Park School District includes the majority of Twin Oaks, and this district is home to one high school, Valley Park High School.

Portions of Twin Oaks are in Parkway C-2 School District.
