= Valley Park, Missouri =

- City
- Valley Park in October 2026

- Location of Valley Park, Missouri
- Coordinates: 38°32′58″N 90°29′50″W
- Country: United States
- State: Missouri
- County: St. Louis

Government
  - Mayor: Chandra Webster
  - City marshal: Scott Rue

Area
  - Total: 5.09 sq mi (13.19 km^{2})
  - Land: 4.50 sq mi (11.66 km^{2})
  - Water: 0.59 sq mi (1.53 km^{2})
- Elevation: 423 ft (129 m)

Population (2020)
  - Total: 6,885
  - Density: 1,529.1/sq mi (590.38/km^{2})
- Time zone: UTC-6 (Central (CST))
  - Summer (DST): UTC-5 (CDT)
- ZIP Code: 63088
- Area code: 636
- FIPS code: 29-75472
- GNIS feature ID: 2397113
- Website: www.valleyparkmo.org

Valley Park is a city in St. Louis County, Missouri, United States. The population was 6,885 at the 2020 census.

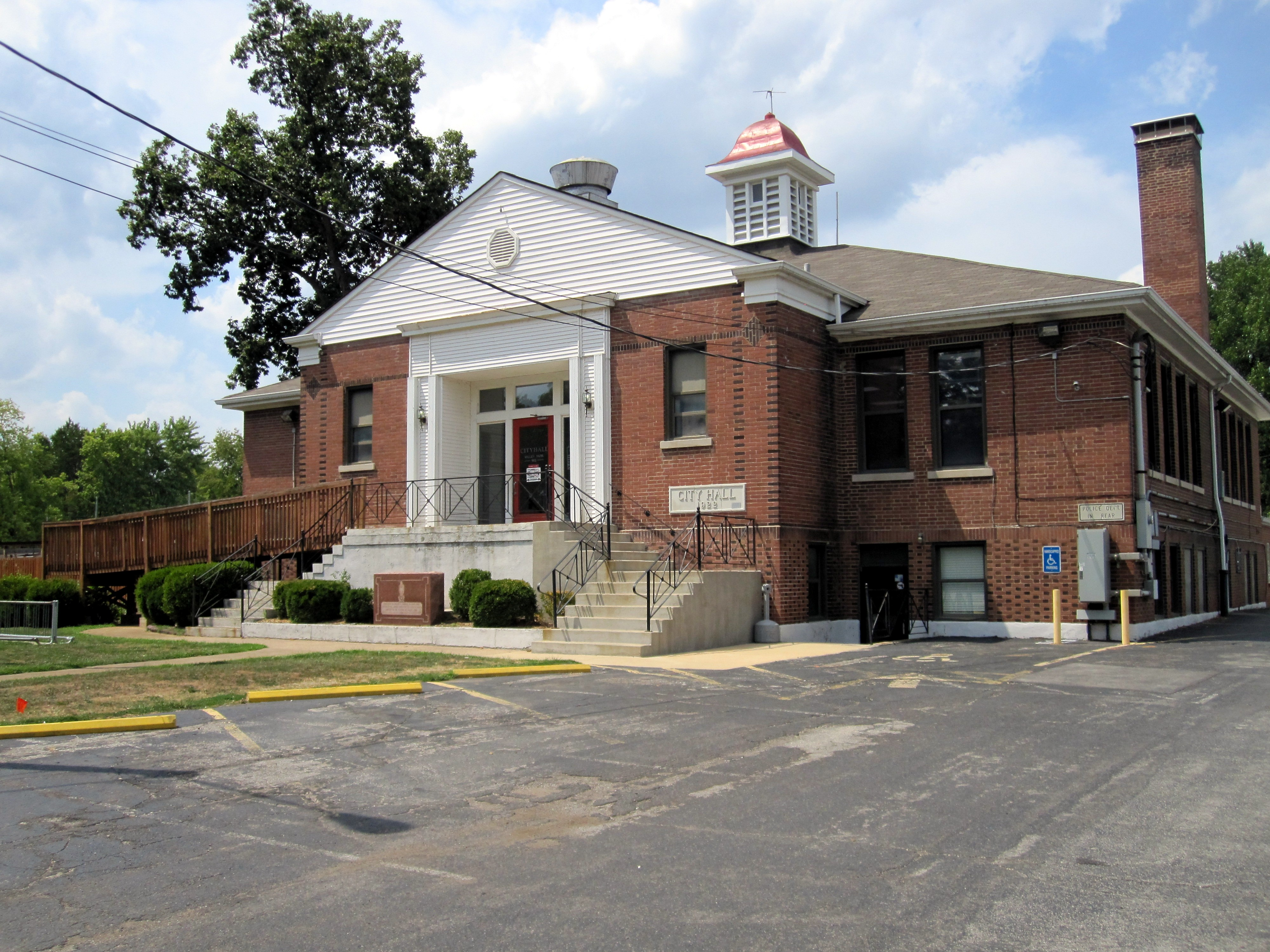
Valley Park City Hall

== History ==
Descendants of the Mississippian culture still had a settlement along the Meramec River in the mid-18th century, until the Native Americans were pushed out by colonial French and German immigrant farmers in the 1760s. The developing village over time was known as Nasby, Sulphur Springs, Quinette, Meramec, and finally Valley Park by circa 1890. It had one of the first post offices established in St. Louis County. It developed as a railroad hub for the Missouri Pacific and St. Louis-San Francisco rail lines.

In 1894, the town became the site of the first lynching in St. Louis County. A black man named John Buckner was lynched when accused of raping a local black woman and a white teenager. He was taken from the authorities by several local residents and farmers and hanged from the main bridge in town overlooking the Meramec River. The lynchers were never prosecuted.

Valley Park and Castlewood Park were developed as summer resorts. Castlewood Park is a short distance west on Big Bend. Castlewood Park became part of the Missouri State Park system.

However, Valley Park began to boom with development. It had railroads, the Meramec River, and what even then were considered main roads. Railroads played a big role in the town in the late 19th century and early 20th century. At the time, the St. Louis-San Francisco (Frisco) and Missouri Pacific served Valley Park; now it is Union Pacific and Burlington Northern Santa Fe. At one time, the Meramec River had barge traffic.

In 1917, the town became incorporated. As many as 70 trains passed through Valley Park on any given day. The town became a center for industry with the building of the glass factory and other industries. Grocery stores and restaurants opened up; churches went from being mission churches to being congregations. Valley Park had a Saddle and Paddle Club located at Marshall and what is now Highway 141.

In the Great Flood of 1913, the main bridge was destroyed along with several factories causing extensive damage to the city's economy.

St. Louis families would board the trains for summer vacations, weekends, or second family homes along the Meramec River. Clubhouses were built on the banks of the Meramec. Some of those clubhouses stood until the 1990s. The 1992 and 1993 floods destroyed them beyond repair. The remains were removed in order to allow for construction of the Meramec Valley River Basin Levee. The levee had a major flood test in March 2008; it saved Valley Park from a devastating flood. Most of the town also survived major flooding of the Meramec in 2015 and 2017, which forced closings of interstate and state roads in the area, and flooded other small towns. The intersection of Highway 141 and Interstate 44 was flooded and closed from December to January 2016. This area flooded again in 2017, cutting off wide areas of cross-country traffic.

The Frisco Hotel is an historic building located at 24 Front Street which was adapted as the Frisco Train Store.

Several parks are within the city limits, including Vance Trails, Leonard, and Brignole parks, and Meramec Landing for anglers and boaters. Simpson St. Louis County Park and Lake and Lone Elk County Park (which also has a wild bird sanctuary) are also within the city limits. Completion of the levee will include trails on top, overlooking the Meramec River for hiking and biking, as part of the Ozark Greenway Trails. In 2010, Valley Park annexed Peerless Park, a former city that disincorporated in 1998.

== Education ==
The majority of Valley Park is served by Valley Park School District, and this district is home to one high school, Valley Park High School.

Portions of Valley Park are in Parkway C-2 School District, and other portions are in Rockwood R-VI School District.

Valley Park has a public library, the Valley Park Community Library.

== Controversy ==
In 2006, Valley Park was featured in local, state and national news media when the city's Board of Aldermen passed an ordinance almost identical to the ordinance passed by the city council of Hazleton, Pennsylvania, which penalized landlords who rented to "illegal aliens", businesses who employed "illegal aliens", and others who aided and abetted "illegal immigration."

Several landlords, along with the Metropolitan St. Louis Equal Housing Opportunity Council, filed suit against the city. The lawsuit was supported by Bryan Cave, Washington University School of Law, St. Louis University Legal Clinic, the ACLU, MALDEF, the Hispanic Ministry of the Catholic Church and several private attorneys, who won a temporary restraining order.

Led by then-mayor Jeffrey Whitteaker, the Board of Aldermen amended the ordinance twice, and the coalition opposing the ordinances won restraining orders against both amended ordinances. The ordinances were invalidated following their repeal. A subsequent appeal by the city was dismissed as moot, in the Missouri Court of Appeals, as the subject ordinances had been repealed. Thereafter, following the city's passage and publication of an ordinance prohibiting the knowing employment of unlawful aliens, a subsequent suit was brought in state court, subsequently removed by the city to federal court. After the city abandoned its efforts to punish landlords who could not prove their tenants were lawfully present and narrowed the enforcement mechanism for the remainder of the ordinance, the district court upheld the remainder of the ordinance. The plaintiffs filed an appeal on procedural issues and asked for the district court decision to be vacated. The appeal was denied and the decision of the district court was affirmed. The city's immigration ordinances have never been enforced.

The Missouri General Assembly, in the 2008 legislative session, enacted legislation, to take effect in August 2009, which included language similar to Valley Park's unlawful employment ordinance, to be enforced by the Missouri Attorney General. The state legislation had been under discussion and review for a significant time in both the Missouri Senate and House of Representatives. It remains unlawful, by Valley Park ordinance, to knowingly hire unlawful aliens within the city.

== Geography ==
The city is located on the north bank of the Meramec River and is served by Missouri Route 141 which connects to I-44 south of the Meramec.

According to the United States Census Bureau, the city has a total area of 4.02 square miles (10.41 km^{2}), of which 3.80 square miles (9.84 km^{2}) is land and 0.22 square miles (0.57 km^{2}) is water.

== Attractions ==
The Museum of Transportation was founded in 1944 and was at one time an original mainline of the Pacific Railroad. It was one of the first railroad tunnels west of the Mississippi River. The tunnel and depot are now on the National Register of Historic Places. With over seventy locomotives that visitors can look at and climb aboard, the museum has the most complete collection of American rail power anywhere, and its collection of automobiles, buses, streetcars, aircraft, horse-drawn vehicles and river boat material reflects the ever-changing nature of transportation. Among the attractions are guided walking tours and rides on the miniature Abbott Railroad. There is a concession stand and gift shop of transportation memorabilia.

The World Bird Sanctuary is located on 305 acres of hardwood forest adjacent to Lone Elk Park. Visitors can see famous or lesser-known birds of prey and other wild birds. Throughout the years birds are on display, and at listed times there are bird shows. The sanctuary was founded in 1977 by ornithologist Walter C. Crawford, Jr. Crawford began his career at the St. Louis City Zoo. Crawford, working with Wild Kingdom star Marlin Perkins, recognized a need for an organization dedicated to birds of prey. Mr. Crawford continued to direct the organization he founded until his death. He also traveled nationwide to speak at conventions and banquets with his humorous and inspirational message of environmental conservation.

Lone Elk Park also contains animals such as elk, deer, buffalo, and turkeys, which can be viewed on a drive through the park.

Meramec Landing sits along the Meramec River. It is a small area to park and unload a boat or jet ski into the river, or for fishing.

Simpson Park is located on the border of Valley Park next to Kirkwood. It has a large lake for boating and fishing, as well as a biking and hiking trail that goes all the way around the lake in a wooded area, and then stretches far outside the park down to the Meramec River. It also has a large playground and plenty of open fields to play soccer, baseball or even fly a kite.

Buder Park is located on the other side of the Meramec River and is considered a St. Louis County/Valley Park park. This park offers fishing access to the river, and open fields for flying kites, or playing football, soccer, or baseball. However, it is best known for its model plane activities. People from all over St. Louis and the surrounding counties come to this park to fly their model planes or fly tight lines. It has two tight lining tracks and a full runway for model airplanes.

== Demographics ==
Historical population
Census	Pop.	Note	%±
1920	899		—
1930	1,772		97.1%
1940	2,091		18.0%
1950	2,956		41.4%
1960	3,452		16.8%
1970	3,662		6.1%
1980	3,232		−11.7%
1990	4,165		28.9%
2000	6,518		56.5%
2010	6,942		6.5%
2020	6,885		−0.8%
U.S. Decennial Census

=== Racial and ethnic composition ===
Valley Park city, Missouri – Racial and ethnic composition Note: the US Census treats Hispanic/Latino as an ethnic category. This table excludes Latinos from the racial categories and assigns them to a separate category. Hispanics/Latinos may be of any race.
Race / Ethnicity (NH = Non-Hispanic)	Pop 2000	Pop 2010	Pop 2020	% 2000	% 2010	% 2020
White alone (NH)	9,738	5,783	5,473	89.39%	83.30%	79.49%
Black or African American alone (NH)	218	268	296	2.00%	3.86%	4.30%
Native American or Alaska Native alone (NH)	4	25	3	0.04%	0.36%	0.04%
Asian alone (NH)	687	438	357	6.31%	6.31%	5.19%
Native Hawaiian or Pacific Islander alone (NH)	1	0	1	0.01%	0.00%	0.01%
Other race alone (NH)	5	8	22	0.05%	0.12%	0.32%
Mixed race or Multiracial (NH)	124	148	377	1.14%	2.13%	5.48%
Hispanic or Latino (any race)	117	272	356	1.07%	3.92%	5.17%
Total	10,894	6,942	6,885	100.00%	100.00%	100.00%

=== 2020 census ===
As of the 2020 census, Valley Park had a population of 6,885. The median age was 37.5 years. 20.1% of residents were under the age of 18 and 17.0% were 65 years of age or older. For every 100 females there were 92.2 males, and for every 100 females age 18 and over there were 91.0 males age 18 and over.

As of the 2020 census, 99.9% of residents lived in urban areas, while 0.1% lived in rural areas.

As of the 2020 census, there were 3,090 households in Valley Park, of which 26.3% had children under the age of 18 living in them. Of all households, 38.9% were married-couple households, 21.2% were households with a male householder and no spouse or partner present, and 31.7% were households with a female householder and no spouse or partner present. About 37.1% of all households were made up of individuals and 14.7% had someone living alone who was 65 years of age or older.

As of the 2020 census, there were 3,247 housing units, of which 4.8% were vacant. The homeowner vacancy rate was 1.6% and the rental vacancy rate was 6.8%.

=== 2010 census ===
As of the census of 2010, there were 6,942 people, 2,974 households, and 1,640 families residing in the city. The population density was 1,826.8 inhabitants per square mile (705.3/km^{2}). There were 3,209 housing units at an average density of 844.5 per square mile (326.1/km^{2}). The racial makeup of the city was 85.1% White, 4.0% African American, 0.4% Native American, 6.3% Asian, 2.0% from other races, and 2.3% from two or more races. Hispanic or Latino of any race were 3.9% of the population.

There were 2,974 households, of which 29.8% had children under the age of 18 living with them, 40.3% were married couples living together, 10.0% had a female householder with no husband present, 4.9% had a male householder with no wife present, and 44.9% were non-families. 36.0% of all households were made up of individuals, and 11.4% had someone living alone who was 65 years of age or older. The average household size was 2.27 and the average family size was 3.04.

The median age in the city was 34.9 years. 23.1% of residents were under the age of 18; 7.9% were between the ages of 18 and 24; 33.2% were from 25 to 44; 22.7% were from 45 to 64; and 13.1% were 65 years of age or older. The gender makeup of the city was 47.8% male and 52.2% female.

=== 2000 census ===
As of the census of 2000, there were 6,518 people, 2,603 households, and 1,663 families residing in the city. The population density was 2,156.2 inhabitants per square mile (832.5/km^{2}). There were 2,744 housing units at an average density of 907.7 per square mile (350.5/km^{2}). The racial makeup of the city was 89.02% White, 4.11% African American, 0.09% Native American, 4.33% Asian, 0.05% Pacific Islander, 0.95% from other races, and 1.46% from two or more races. Hispanic or Latino of any race were 2.27% of the population.

There were 2,603 households, out of which 37.1% had children under the age of 18 living with them, 48.4% were married couples living together, 11.3% had a female householder with no husband present, and 36.1% were non-families. 28.2% of all households were made up of individuals, and 6.1% had someone living alone who was 65 years of age or older. The average household size was 2.45 and the average family size was 3.06.

In the city, the population was spread out, with 27.3% under the age of 18, 7.7% from 18 to 24, 41.5% from 25 to 44, 14.7% from 45 to 64, and 8.7% who were 65 years of age or older. The median age was 32 years. For every 100 females, there were 95.6 males. For every 100 females age 18 and over, there were 91.0 males.

The median income for a household in the city was $43,548, and the median income for a family was $54,063. Males had a median income of $40,956 versus $31,617 for females. The per capita income for the city was $20,720. About 8.7% of families and 10.7% of the population were below the poverty line, including 16.0% of those under age 18 and 1.8% of those age 65 or over.
