= Parkway School District =

School district in St. Louis, Missouri, USA

Parkway C-2 School District

Location
- 455 N. Woods Mill Road; Chesterfield, Missouri United States

District information
- Grades: K-12
- Superintendent: Melissa Schneider
- Schools: 28
- Budget: $200,000,000 (2015-16)
- NCES District ID: 2923580

Students and staff
- Students: 17,976 (2018-19)
- Teachers: 1206.96 FTE
- Staff: 1320.00 FTE
- Student–teacher ratio: 14.89

Other information
- Website: Official website

Parkway C-2 School District, or Parkway Schools, is a public school district serving eight municipalities in western St. Louis County, Missouri, United States. The district headquarters is in Chesterfield. The district operates four comprehensive high schools, one alternative high school, five middle schools, and eighteen elementary schools, and one early childhood center. The district is named for the Daniel Boone Parkway, also known as Interstate 64.

== Boundary ==
The district includes all of Country Life Acres, as well as the majorities of Creve Coeur, Manchester, Town and Country, and Winchester. It also includes portions of Chesterfield, Des Peres, Maryland Heights, Twin Oaks, Valley Park, Ballwin and Westwood.

== List of schools ==
High schools

- Fern Ridge High School (alternative high school)
- Parkway Central High School
- Parkway North High School
- Parkway South High School
- Parkway West High School

Middle schools

- Parkway Central Middle School
- Parkway Northeast Middle School
- Parkway South Middle School
- Parkway Southwest Middle School
- Parkway West Middle School

Elementary schools

- Barretts Elementary School
- Bellerive Elementary School
- Carman Trails Elementary School
- Claymont Elementary School
- Craig Elementary School
- Green Trails Elementary School
- Hanna Woods Elementary School
- Henry Elementary School
- Highcroft Ridge Elementary School
- Mason Ridge Elementary School
- McKelvey Elementary School
- Oak Brook Elementary School
- Pierremont Elementary School
- River Bend Elementary School
- Ross Elementary School
- Shenandoah Valley Elementary School
- Sorrento Springs Elementary School
- Wren Hollow Elementary School
