= Glenn Savan =

American novelist (1953–2003)

Glenn Savan (1953 – April 14, 2003) was an American writer best known for White Palace, his 1987 debut novel. A film adaptation, starring Susan Sarandon and James Spader, was released in 1990.

== Biography ==
White Palace was published in trade paperback by Bantam New Fiction, part of the 1980s trend of editors trying to "find material from which to fashion and refashion quality trade paperback lines."

Savan's second novel, Goldman's Anatomy, was published in 1993. The Los Angeles Times called it "long-awaited" and "even more assured" than White Palace. Goldman's Anatomy was inspired in part by Savan's own struggles with degenerative joint ailments and other health issues.

Savan was a native of St. Louis, Missouri, the setting of both of his novels. He was an alumnus of the Iowa Writers' Workshop. Savan suffered from a degenerative joint disease as well as from Parkinson's disease. He died from a stroke or a heart attack at his home, aged 49.

== Books ==
- White Palace (1987)
- Goldman's Anatomy (1993)
