= John F. Kennedy High School (Cheektowaga, New York) =

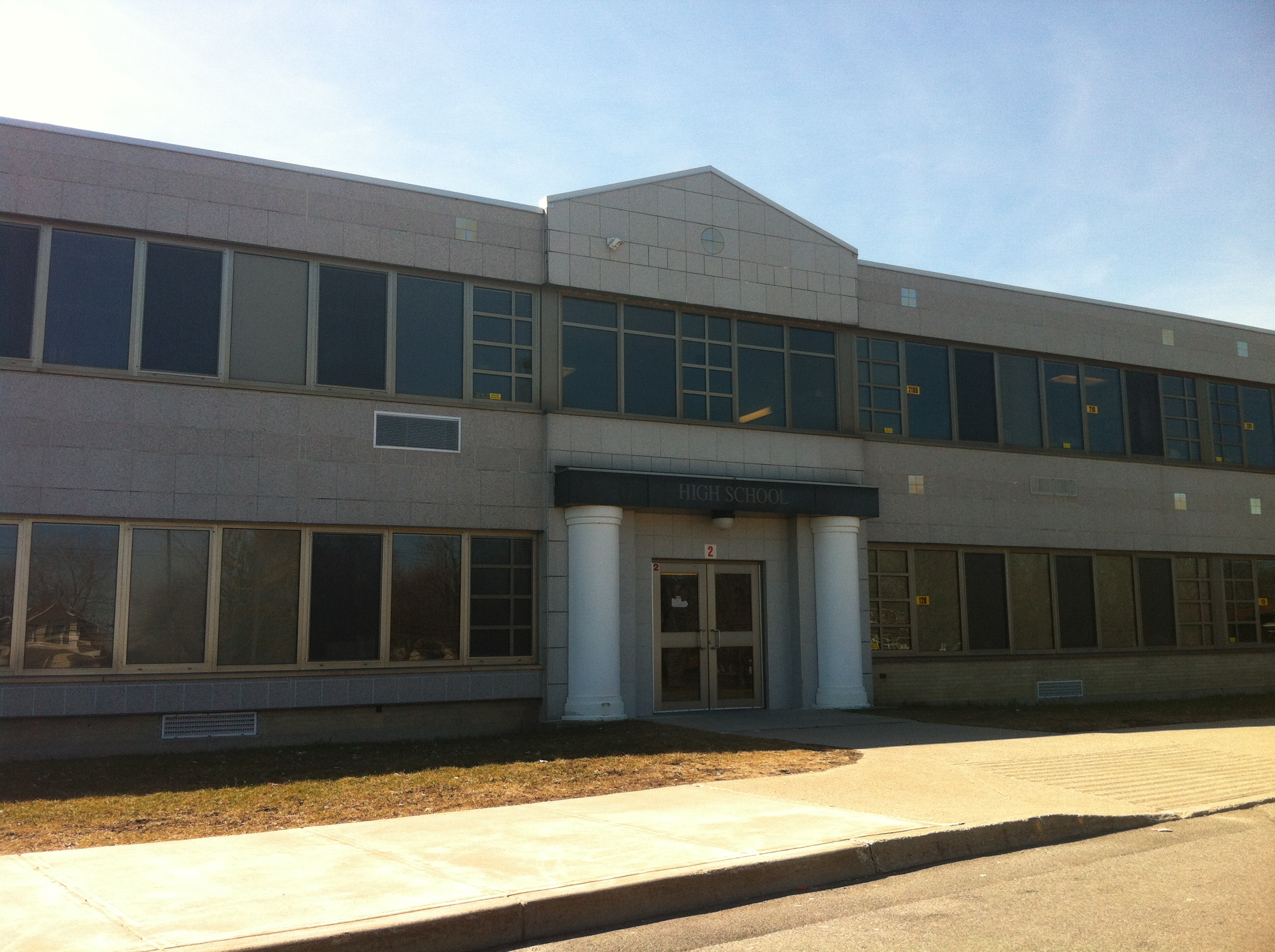

Location
- 305 Cayuga Creek Road; Sloan; Cheektowaga, Erie County, New York 14227; United States; 42.8762°N 78.7749°W

Information
- Established: 1962
- School district: Cheektowaga-Sloan Union Free School District
- NCES School ID: 362700003672
- Principal: Robert Julian
- Teaching staff: 36.68
- Grades: 9–12
  - Grade 9: 103
  - Grade 10: 106
  - Grade 11: 78
  - Grade 12: 75
  - Other: 4
- Student to teacher ratio: 10.06
- Hours in school day: 7 hours (7:20 AM to 2:20 PM)
- Mascot: Grizzly Bear
- Team name: Bears
- Rival: Cleveland Hill Union Free School District
- Website: John F. Kennedy High School

John F. Kennedy High School is a high school located in Cheektowaga, New York, in the United States. It is purported to be the first public school in the United States to be named for the sitting president.

== History ==
John F. Kennedy High School was opened on September 5, 1962 and the cornerstone was laid on August 12, 1962. It would later be named for President John F. Kennedy, the first school to do so. Until 1997, the middle school grades were housed in the high school until the district formed the new middle school.

The forester Bruce Kershner was a teacher at JFK high school until his death in 2007.

John F. Kennedy Middle School is housed in the same building as JFKHS. So that means the building houses grades 6-12, though different schools.

=== Selected former principals ===
Previous assignment and reason for departure denoted in parentheses

- Henry M. Andrzejewski–1967-1978 (Assistant Principal/Director of Athletics - John F. Kennedy High School, retired)
- Daniel F. Mahoney–1977-1996 (Principal - Woodrow Wilson Elementary, retired)
- Richard E. Andrzejewski–1996-2002 (Assistant Principal - John F. Kennedy Junior/Senior High School, retired)
- Stephen A. Bovino–2002-2007 (Assistant Principal - Williamsville South High School, named Assistant Superintendent for Human Resources of Kenmore-Town of Tonawanda Union Free School District)
- Bobbi Lin Meyers [interim]–2007 (Technology Integrator - Cheektowaga-Sloan Union Free School District, returned to position)
- Lawrence Ljungberg–2007-2010 (Principal - Global Concepts Charter School, named Dean of Instruction of Oracle Charter School)
- Kevin E. Kazmierczak–2010-2018 (Principal - Tonawanda High School, retired)
- Jeremy P. Moore–2018 (Assistant Principal - Brockport High School, named Interim Principal of Trumansburg Elementary School)
- Jason T. Zuba [interim]–2019 (Coordinator of Instructional Technology/Data & Professional Development - Cheektowaga-Sloan Union Free School District, returned to position)

== Athletics ==
Fall sports: Girls soccer, cheerleading, cross country, football, and volleyball Winter sports: Basketball, bowling, and cheerleading Spring sports: Baseball, softball, boys tennis, and track, and field.
