= William A. Raisch =

American politician (1928–1996)

Member of the U.S. House of Representatives from Missouri's 107th district

Missouri House of Representatives
- Incumbent
- Assumed office 1971

Personal details
- Born: 1928 St. Louis, Missouri, US
- Died: 1996 (aged 67–68)
- Party: Republican
- Spouse: Jo Ann P. Sestric
- Children: 2 sons
- Occupation: teacher

William A. Raisch (June 4, 1928 – February 3, 1996) was an American Republican politician who served in the Missouri House of Representatives. He was born in St. Louis, Missouri, and was educated at St. Louis public schools, Southeast Missouri State College, Saint Louis University, and Washington University. On March 15, 1954, he married Jo Ann P. Sestric who died in 2022. Raisch served as a paratrooper with the 11th Airborne at the end of World War II and with the Missouri Air National Guard at Jefferson Barracks.
