= Queeny Township, St. Louis County, Missouri =

Township in St. Louis County, Missouri, U.S.

Coordinates: 38°34′6″N 90°29′55″W

Queeny Township is a township in St. Louis County, in the U.S. state of Missouri. Its population was 37,665 as of the 2010 census.
