= Meramec Township, St. Louis County, Missouri =

Township in St. Louis County, Missouri, U.S.

Coordinates: 38°34′17″N 90°36′52″W

Meramec Township is a township in St. Louis County, in the U.S. state of Missouri. Its population was 39,731 as of the 2010 census.
