= White Palace (film) =

1990 film by Luis Mandoki

- Theatrical release poster
- Directed by: Luis Mandoki
- Screenplay by: Ted Tally; Alvin Sargent
- Based on: White Palace by Glenn Savan
- Produced by: Griffin Dunne; Amy Robinson; Mark Rosenberg
- Starring: Susan Sarandon; James Spader
- Cinematography: Lajos Koltai
- Edited by: Carol Fisher; Carol Littleton
- Music by: George Fenton
- Production companies: Mirage Enterprises; Double Play
- Distributed by: Universal Pictures
- Release date: October 19, 1990
- Running time: 103 minutes
- Country: United States
- Language: English
- Box office: $17.4 million

White Palace is a 1990 American erotic romantic drama film directed by Luis Mandoki. It stars Susan Sarandon, James Spader, Jason Alexander, Kathy Bates, Steven Hill, Jeremy Piven, and Renée Taylor. It was written by Ted Tally and Alvin Sargent, based on the 1987 novel by Glenn Savan (who appears in the film as an extra with a small speaking part).

It centers on the unlikely relationship between a young upper middle class widower (Spader) who falls in love with a middle-aged working class waitress (Sarandon) in St. Louis, Missouri. The original music score was composed by George Fenton. The film is marketed with the tagline "The story of a younger man and a bolder woman".

== Plot ==
Twenty-seven-year-old St. Louis advertising executive Max Baron has shut himself off from the world in the two years since the auto accident that killed his wife Janey. En route to his friend Neil's bachelor party, Max picks up fifty burgers from a diner called White Palace. At the party, he discovers that the order is six burgers short and, to the ridicule of his friends, returns to the restaurant to complain.

At the White Palace diner, after a dispute occurs between Max and a forty-three-year-old waitress, Nora Baker, she refunds him. Max returns to the party but leaves upset, heads to a bar and runs into Nora. Drunk, she flirts with him, but he pushes her advances away and starts to leave. She senses that he is upset, asks why, and discovers his wife's death. She discloses that her young son died of leukemia. The 'connection' prevents him from leaving. They have some drinks and eventually he gives her a lift home to the Dogtown neighborhood in St. Louis, but drunkenly crashes his car into her mailbox. She invites him to spend the night at her house, with the couch as his bed. Max starts dreaming about his late wife, then wakes up to find Nora performing fellatio on him. They end up having passionate sex.

After visiting Janey's grave on the second anniversary of her death, Max returns to White Palace to watch a busy Nora from a distance. He visits her at home with the pretext of replacing the broken mailbox, but instead they begin a relationship. Max becomes more relaxed and cheerful around Nora and at his work, but remains reluctant to reveal their relationship to his family and friends. He eventually gets frustrated that all he and Nora do is sit and watch TV in her house. She reminds him of their differences in age and social backgrounds.

Nora is angry after Max lied to her about his friend Neil's wedding and that he did not take her. They argue about how Max keeps their relationship a secret and that he is probably ashamed of being seen with her. Nora's sister, Judy, meets Max the following day and explains to him, in Nora's absence, how they were abandoned as children and that she left a young Nora to fend for herself. Judy also explains that Nora's son drowned.

While at the supermarket with Nora, Max leaves her at the counter and runs into Neil's wife, Rachel, who invites him and his "mystery woman" to Thanksgiving. At Max's apartment, Nora hears a message on his answering machine inviting them to the Horowitzes' home for Thanksgiving. Nora brings up the subject to a hesitant Max; however, they resolve to attend as a couple. At the Thanksgiving dinner with Neil, Rachel, Mrs. Baron, Max's friends, and the Horowitz extended family make Nora uncomfortable. Following an argument between Nora and Neil's father, she walks out, Max and his mother following. After the dinner, Nora and Max argue in her house over what happened, and she tells him to leave.

Max later finds Nora's house empty and a note explaining to him that she left and that he should not come looking for her. He visits White Palace and is informed that Nora quit. He goes to a brunch with friends and meets Heidi Solomon, but cannot stop thinking about Nora. He then realizes that everyone around him seems stuck-up and obsessed with their "perfect" upper-middle class lives. He travels to New York to find Nora's sister Judy, and is informed that Nora is waitressing in a restaurant. Max finds Nora there and confesses his love to her, revealing that he quit his job and moved to New York to be with her. They reunite, kissing as patrons of the restaurant look on. Max clears the table of its contents and lays a laughing Nora down on it, climbing on top of her and kissing her, while the whole restaurant cheers and applauds.

== Cast ==
- Susan Sarandon as Nora Baker
- James Spader as Max Baron
- Jason Alexander as Neil
- Kathy Bates as Rosemary
- Eileen Brennan as Judy
- Steven Hill as Sol Horowitz
- Corey Parker as Larry Klugman
- Rachel Chagall as Rachel
- Renée Taylor as Edith Baron
- Jonathan Penner as Marv Miller
- Barbara Howard as Sherri Klugman
- Kim Myers as Heidi Solomon
- Mitzi McCall as Sophie Rosen

== Production ==
The original title for the film was to have been The White Castle, and the novel even makes reference to a specific real White Castle location at the intersection of S. Grand Blvd. and Gravois Ave. in south St. Louis, but the restaurant chain refused permission to use its trademarked name in either the novel or the film, and also refused permission to allow any of its restaurants for filming locations.

Instead, an independent diner at the intersection of North Eighteenth and Olive Streets just west of downtown St. Louis was used – and that address is even given in the film as a plug for the diner. After the film was released the diner's owners sought permission to permanently rename it "White Palace", but were refused by the studio, so the diner was instead renamed "White Knight".

The movie also features and was shot almost entirely in the St. Louis area, including the Thanksgiving Dinner scenes, which were filmed in a private home off Conway Road located at #2 Frontenac Place in west St. Louis County, and Nora's house, which was in the Dogtown neighborhood of the City of St. Louis northwest of the intersection of Hampton and Manchester Avenues at 1521 W. Billon Avenue.

The film also originally shot scenes which followed a subplot in the film, in which Max (James Spader) and his boss Rosemary (Kathy Bates) start working for a new client at their advertising agency. In the book, this woman is named Stephanie Deluc. Both Max and Rosemary have a difficult relationship with her throughout the novel, culminating in Max losing his temper with her later on and losing his job because of it. Gina Gershon was cast as Stephanie Deluc in the film, and shot many scenes, presumably following this subplot of the novel. However, for reasons unknown, the studio removed all the scenes, which meant that Gershon's entire role ended up on the cutting room floor, and she no longer appears in the film. This also meant that Kathy Bates's role of Rosemary, Max's boss, was greatly reduced, now appearing very briefly in the finished film in a couple of scenes, in only one of which she has some dialogue.

In the January 1995 issue of Movieline magazine, Susan Sarandon revealed she was very nervous before doing the infamous oral sex scene with James Spader.

== Home media ==
White Palace was released on VHS on March 21, 1991 & released on Laserdisc in 1993 by MCA/Universal Home Video. GoodTimes Entertainment released the film via DVD on May 1, 2001. The DVD was released on March 1, 2005, from Universal's Studio Collections after the DVD release in UK. The Blu-ray was released on October 30, 2017, in United Kingdom (which was never released in United States) by Fabulous Films Limited. Alliance Entertainment put out the film on Blu-ray in the United States on June 23, 2026.

== Reception ==
White Palace received mixed reviews from critics. On Rotten Tomatoes, it has a 48% approval rating based on 29 reviews, with an average score of 5.8/10. Metacritic, which uses a weighted average, assigned the film a score of 66 out of 100, based on 21 critics, indicating "generally favorable" reviews.

Roger Ebert wrote that the film is at its best when exploring the two main leads' "nonconforming relationship" outside of their social circles and suffers when going through the "same sappy romantic clichés as countless other love stories." He concluded: "And yet there's a lot that's good in "White Palace," involving the heart as well as the mind." Gene Siskel of the Chicago Tribune wrote that "the film manages to avoid the more interesting problem area of what will happen to the couple once they decide to settle down and live openly together. Both principals, however, are good in their limited roles." Entertainment Weekly's Owen Gleiberman gave the film a "B−" grade, calling it "yet another bogus movie about class differences" that wants its audience to laugh at the characters' "most superficial traits", but praised Spader and Sarandon for bringing "a shaggy sense of fun" to their roles, saying they "make White Palace worth seeing, but too often they're fighting the movie's smugness." Janet Maslin of The New York Times was critical of the "unconvincing" production design of the "nouveau riche" and "squalid" sides of St. Louis and the "badly cast" supporting characters for diminishing the overall plot, but gave praise to Spader and Sarandon for elevating the "many preconceptions and clichés" throughout the material, highlighting the latter for giving "a zesty, spirited, fully formed performance".
