= John F. Kennedy Catholic High School (Missouri) =

Location
- 500 Woods Mill Road; Manchester, St. Louis County, Missouri 63011; United States; 38°36′6″N 90°30′28″W

Information
- Type: Private, coeducational
- Motto: "Community, Excellence, Compassion."
- Religious affiliation: Roman Catholic
- Established: 1968
- Closed: 2017
- Oversight: Archdiocese of Saint Louis
- Grades: 9–12
- Campus size: 23 acres (1,000,000 ft^{2})
- Colors: Green and gold
- Nickname: Celts
- Rival: Trinity Catholic High School, Bishop DuBourg High School, Cardinal Ritter College Preparatory High School, and St Mary's High School
- Accreditation: North Central Association of Colleges and Schools
- Newspaper: Torch
- Yearbook: Profiles
- Website: https://web.archive.org/*/https://www.kennedycatholic.net

John F. Kennedy Catholic High School was a private, Roman Catholic high school in Manchester, Missouri, United States from 1968 to 2017. It was located in the Roman Catholic Archdiocese of Saint Louis.

The property was purchased by Fontbonne University to add to the university portfolio of campuses. The university uses the campus to focus on graduate and evening programs for adult students, expanded MBA and master's programs in accounting, leadership, computer science and supply chain management, be a home for the Ed.D. program. In addition to academics, the former Kennedy campus will be used by Athletics for practice fields, gymnasiums and track.

== Background ==
John F. Kennedy Catholic High School (Kennedy Catholic) was established in 1968 and is named after President John F. Kennedy.

=== General information ===
John F. Kennedy High School had about 280 students at time of closing.

It was the only co-educational, archdiocesan Catholic High School in West County, St. Louis, Missouri.

Kennedy had recently renovated its entire campus with its first capital campaign in 40 years, raising over $1 million. The newly remodeled building included a new entrance, commons area, cafeteria, and offices, though it still lacked windows.

Kennedy was located off of MO-141, north of Manchester Road.

=== Extracurricular ===
Kennedy offered a wide variety of student clubs and activities. Boys' sports included football, soccer, swimming, cross country, baseball, basketball, tennis, golf, and track. Girls' sports included soccer, swimming, cross country, softball, basketball, tennis, golf, track, and volleyball.

=== Booster Club ===
The Booster Club provided additional income to the Kennedy athletic program, through the sale of the Celt Club Card and various fundraising activities. Traditionally, the Kennedy Dads were visible on Kennedy Pride Days, performing chores around the 23-acre (93,000 m^{2}) campus and baking cookies for Open House.

=== Mothers' Club ===
The Mothers' Club met twice monthly, serving the Kennedy community and one another through spiritual support. The Mothers' Club also helped organize and disseminate Kennedy class information. Every Kennedy mother was invited to attend Mass in the chapel each month and to participate in all-school liturgies throughout the year.

=== Advancement Office ===
Kennedy's Advancement Office was the liaison between the school and the parent organizations.

Due to the financial constraints of the 2008 economic recession, Kennedy had instituted a tuition assistance initiative called "Celts Helping Celts." Fundraisers such as a Spaghetti Dinner, a Freshman Dance Party and a Mardi Gras T-shirt sale raised money that was earmarked for families who needed tuition assistance.

== Campus ==
The campus had 23 acres (9.3 ha) of land. The archdiocese had been the owner of the property.

== Clubs, sports, and activities ==
=== Athletics ===
Boys	Girls
Baseball	
Basketball	Basketball
Cross country	Cross country
Golf	Golf
Football	Spirit Squad
Soccer	Soccer
In-line hockey (co-ed)	In-line hockey (co-ed)
	Softball
Track & field	Track & field
Tennis	Tennis
	Volleyball

=== Clubs ===
Social opportunities	Academic clubs	Leadership opportunities
Art Club	Book Club	Link Crew
Green Team	Drama Club	Student Ambassadors
SADD	National Honor Society	Student Council
Photography	Torch (student newspaper)	Student Tour Guides
Movie Club	Profiles (yearbook)	Student Escorts
Film-Making Club	Focus St. Louis Leadership Team	Pro-Life
Ping Pong	BASIC (Brothers and Sisters in Christ)	Chess Club

== Notable alumni ==
Steven M. LaValle, 1986, computer scientist, roboticist, and early founder of Oculus VR

Jay Marshall, 2001, former MLB pitcher

== Closing and redevelopment ==
In September 2016, the Archdiocese of St. Louis announced the school would be closing following the 2016–2017 school year due to declining enrollment.

Fontbonne University acquired the campus with the intention of making it student athletic and continuing education property, spending $8 million.

However, Fontbonne then sold it in 2020 before it was able to convert the campus to its intended use, having spent an additional $3 million, approximately, out of a planned $30 million. As of Dec 2021 the school is going to be torn down for a new subdivision.
