= Lafayette Township, St. Louis County, Missouri =

Township in St. Louis County, Missouri, U.S.

Lafayette Township, Missouri
- Township
- Interactive map of Lafayette Township, Missouri
- Coordinates: 38°37′02″N 90°32′37″W
- Country: United States
- State: Missouri
- County: St. Louis

Population (2010)
  - Total: 33,513
- Time zone: UTC-6 (Central (CST))
  - Summer (DST): UTC-5 (CDT)

Lafayette Township is a township in St. Louis County, in the U.S. state of Missouri. Its population was 33,513 as of the 2010 census.
