= Manchester, Missouri =

- City
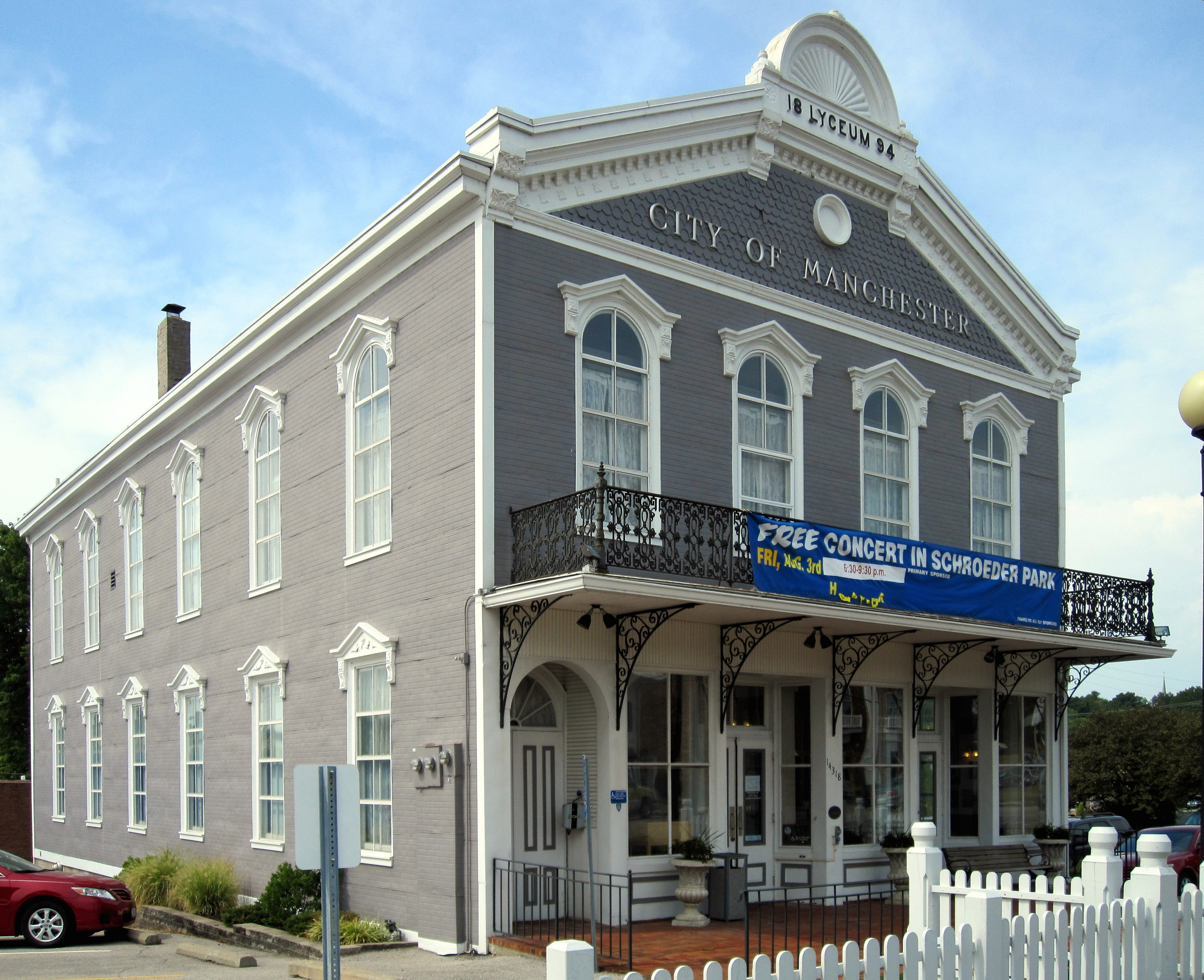
- Manchester City Hall, located in the Lyceum Building, which is listed on the National Register of Historic Places.

- Location of Manchester, Missouri
- Coordinates: 38°34′59″N 90°30′23″W
- Country: United States
- State: Missouri
- County: St. Louis

Area
  - Total: 5.03 sq mi (13.03 km^{2})
  - Land: 5.03 sq mi (13.03 km^{2})
  - Water: 0 sq mi (0.00 km^{2})
- Elevation: 604 ft (184 m)

Population (2020)
  - Total: 18,333
  - Density: 3,643.4/sq mi (1,406.73/km^{2})
- Time zone: UTC-6 (Central (CST))
  - Summer (DST): UTC-5 (CDT)
- FIPS code: 29-45668
- GNIS feature ID: 2395827
- Website: www.manchestermo.gov

Manchester is a city in St. Louis County, Missouri, United States. The population was 18,333 at the 2020 census.

== History ==
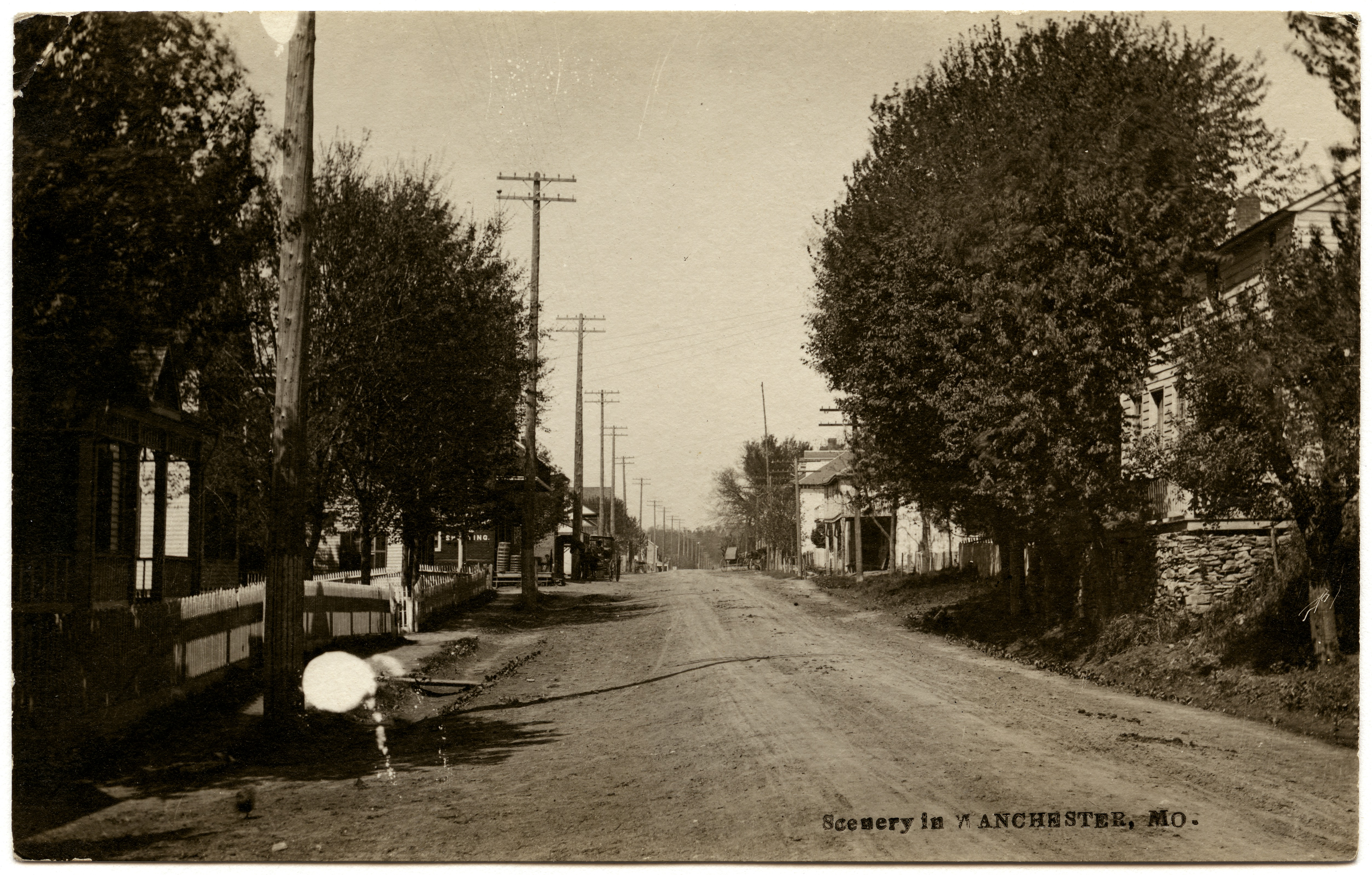
Manchester in 1911.

Manchester was named by an English settler after Manchester, England. It was incorporated as a village in 1950 and then reincorporated as a fourth class city in 1959.

== Geography ==
According to the United States Census Bureau, the city has a total area of 5.08 square miles (13.16 km^{2}), all land.

== Demographics ==
Historical population
Census	Pop.	Note	%±
1960	2,021		—
1970	5,031		148.9%
1980	6,351		26.2%
1990	6,542		3.0%
2000	19,161		192.9%
2010	18,094		−5.6%
2020	18,333		1.3%
U.S. Decennial Census

=== Racial and ethnic composition ===
Manchester city, Missouri – Racial and ethnic composition Note: the US Census treats Hispanic/Latino as an ethnic category. This table excludes Latinos from the racial categories and assigns them to a separate category. Hispanics/Latinos may be of any race.
Race / Ethnicity (NH = Non-Hispanic)	Pop 2000	Pop 2010	Pop 2020	% 2000	% 2010	% 2020
White alone (NH)	17,355	15,543	14,719	90.57%	85.90%	80.29%
Black or African American alone (NH)	462	555	647	2.41%	3.07%	3.53%
Native American or Alaska Native alone (NH)	15	22	16	0.08%	0.12%	0.09%
Asian alone (NH)	811	1,078	1,241	4.23%	5.96%	6.77%
Native Hawaiian or Pacific Islander alone (NH)	4	3	2	0.02%	0.02%	0.01%
Other race alone (NH)	22	16	48	0.11%	0.09%	0.26%
Mixed race or Multiracial (NH)	200	352	920	1.04%	1.95%	5.02%
Hispanic or Latino (any race)	292	525	740	1.52%	2.90%	4.04%
Total	19,161	18,094	18,333	100.00%	100.00%	100.00%

=== 2020 census ===
As of the 2020 census, Manchester had a population of 18,333, with 7,316 households and 4,917 families. The population density was 3,644.7 per square mile (1,407.0/km^{2}). There were 7,617 housing units, of which 4.0% were vacant, at an average density of 1,539.2 per square mile (594.2/km^{2}). The homeowner vacancy rate was 1.2% and the rental vacancy rate was 7.3%.

The median age was 39.9 years. 22.5% of residents were under the age of 18; 6.6% were between 18 and 24; 25.8% were from 25 to 44; 26.7% were from 45 to 64; and 18.6% were 65 years of age or older. For every 100 females there were 94.7 males, and for every 100 females age 18 and over there were 92.3 males age 18 and over.

100.0% of residents lived in urban areas, while 0.0% lived in rural areas.

Of the 7,316 households, 30.2% had children under the age of 18 living in them. Of all households, 56.2% were married-couple households, 14.3% were households with a male householder and no spouse or partner present, and 24.6% were households with a female householder and no spouse or partner present. About 24.8% of all households were made up of individuals and 10.5% had someone living alone who was 65 years of age or older. The average household size was 2.4 and the average family size was 3.1.

Racial composition as of the 2020 census
Race	Number	Percent
White	14,896	81.3%
Black or African American	652	3.6%
American Indian and Alaska Native	19	0.1%
Asian	1,245	6.8%
Native Hawaiian and Other Pacific Islander	2	0.0%
Some other race	246	1.3%
Two or more races	1,273	6.9%
Hispanic or Latino (of any race)	740	4.0%

=== 2016–2020 American Community Survey ===
The 2016–2020 5-year American Community Survey estimates show that the median household income was $78,381 (with a margin of error of +/- $11,143) and the median family income was $100,227 (+/- $6,683). Males had a median income of $52,025 (+/- $6,379) versus $44,271 (+/- $5,783) for females. The median income for those above 16 years old was $49,447 (+/- $4,092). Approximately, 4.7% of families and 6.4% of the population were below the poverty line, including 7.7% of those under the age of 18 and 4.3% of those ages 65 or over.

=== 2010 census ===
As of the census of 2010, there were 18,094 people, 7,239 households, and 5,048 families living in the city. The population density was 3,561.8 inhabitants per square mile (1,375.2/km^{2}). There were 7,553 housing units at an average density of 1,486.8 per square mile (574.1/km^{2}). The racial makeup of the city was 87.6% White, 3.1% African American, 0.2% Native American, 6.0% Asian, 1.1% from other races, and 2.1% from two or more races. Hispanic or Latino of any race were 2.9% of the population.

There were 7,239 households, of which 32.4% had children under the age of 18 living with them, 57.7% were married couples living together, 8.7% had a female householder with no husband present, 3.3% had a male householder with no wife present, and 30.3% were non-families. 24.3% of all households were made up of individuals, and 7.7% had someone living alone who was 65 years of age or older. The average household size was 2.50 and the average family size was 3.00.

The median age in the city was 38.9 years. 23.5% of residents were under the age of 18; 8% were between the ages of 18 and 24; 26.2% were from 25 to 44; 29.5% were from 45 to 64; and 12.9% were 65 years of age or older. The gender makeup of the city was 48.7% male and 51.3% female.

=== 2000 census ===
As of the census of 2000, there were 19,161 people, 7,206 households, and 5,332 families living in the city. The population density was 3,834.6 inhabitants per square mile (1,480.5/km^{2}). There were 7,402 housing units at an average density of 1,481.3 per square mile (571.9/km^{2}). The racial makeup of the city was 91.60% White, 2.42% African American, 0.09% Native American, 4.33% Asian, 0.03% Pacific Islander, 0.40% from other races, and 1.13% from two or more races. Hispanic or Latino of any race were 1.52% of the population.

There were 7,206 households, out of which 37.5% had children under the age of 18 living with them, 63.3% were married couples living together, 8.2% had a female householder with no husband present, and 26.0% were non-families. 20.6% of all households were made up of individuals, and 5.4% had someone living alone who was 65 years of age or older. The average household size was 2.66 and the average family size was 3.12.

In the city, the population was spread out, with 27.2% under the age of 18, 7.5% from 18 to 24, 30.8% from 25 to 44, 25.5% from 45 to 64, and 9.0% who were 65 years of age or older. The median age was 36 years. For every 100 females, there were 95.0 males. For every 100 females age 18 and over, there were 90.6 males.

The median income for a household in the city was $64,381, and the median income for a family was $71,329. Males had a median income of $50,783 versus $35,039 for females. The per capita income for the city was $27,663. About 1.5% of families and 3.0% of the population were below the poverty line, including 3.4% of those under age 18 and 1.1% of those age 65 or over.

== Education ==
The vast majority of Manchester is in the Parkway School District, while a small portion in the south is in the Valley Park School District.

The Parkway district has one high school located within the Manchester city limits: Parkway South High School. Two middle schools (South Middle and Southwest Middle) serve this high school area, and several elementary schools bring education to the neighborhood level. Hanna Woods, Carman Trails, and Wren Hollow are some of the elementary schools that serve Manchester.

The Grand Glaize Branch of St. Louis County Library is in Manchester.

John F. Kennedy Catholic High School was in Manchester until its 2017 closure.
