= National Register of Historic Places listings in Jefferson County, Missouri =

Location of Jefferson County in Missouri

This is a list of the National Register of Historic Places listings in Jefferson County, Missouri.

This is intended to be a complete list of the properties and districts on the National Register of Historic Places in Jefferson County, Missouri, United States. Latitude and longitude coordinates are provided for many National Register properties and districts; these locations may be seen together in a map.

There are 15 properties and districts listed on the National Register in the county.

This National Park Service list is complete through NPS recent listings posted October 2, 2026.

== Current listings ==
	Name on the Register	Image	Date listed	Location	City or town	Description
1	Beaumont-Tyson Quarry District		October 10, 1974 (#74001079)	Address restricted	Times Beach	212 acres (86 ha) area which extends also into St. Louis County
2	Boemler Archeological District		October 1, 1974 (#74001075)	Address Restricted	Byrnes Mill	
3	Boland Archeological District		October 1, 1974 (#74001080)	Address Restricted	Times Beach	
4	Central School Campus	Central School Campus	October 8, 2009 (#09000813)	221 S. 3rd St. 38°08′18″N 90°33′23″W	De Soto	
5	Thomas C. Fletcher House	Thomas C. Fletcher House	November 19, 1974 (#74001076)	Elm between 1st and 2nd Sts. 38°13′55″N 90°34′02″W	Hillsboro	
6	Gustave Greystone-Meissner House	Gustave Greystone-Meissner House	December 31, 1974 (#74001078)	Northeast of Pevely off U.S. Route 61; 38°18′13″N 90°22′48″W	Pevely	
7	Kimmswick Bone Bed	Kimmswick Bone Bed	November 5, 1980 (#80002371)	Junction of Rock and Little Rock Creeks; 38°22′45″N 90°23′01″W	Imperial	Also known as "Mastodon State Historic Site".
8	Kimmswick Historic District	Kimmswick Historic District	July 24, 2007 (#07000752)	Roughly bounded by Front St., 4th St., Mill St., Elm St., and Oak St. 38°22′00″N 90°21′51″W	Kimmswick	
9	Valentine Leight General Store	Valentine Leight General Store	August 18, 1992 (#92001014)	4566 Main St. 38°24′37″N 90°34′09″W	House Springs	
10	Moder Archeological District		October 16, 1974 (#74001077)	Address Restricted	House Springs	
11	Louis J. and Harriet Rozier House	Louis J. and Harriet Rozier House	April 5, 2006 (#06000221)	322 W. Clement; 38°08′16″N 90°33′27″W	DeSoto	
12	Sandy Creek Covered Bridge	Sandy Creek Covered Bridge	July 8, 1970 (#70000337)	5 miles north of Hillsboro off U.S. Route 21; 38°17′38″N 90°31′05″W	Hillsboro	
13	Stonebrook	Stonebrook	January 14, 2011 (#10001130)	3511 Stonebrook Forest Dr. 38°21′38″N 90°27′44″W	Antonia	
14	Waggener Dairy Barn	Waggener Dairy Barn	February 24, 2022 (#100006081)	1700 Boyce Ln. 38°08′57″N 90°23′21″W	Festus vicinity	
15	Windsor Harbor Road Bridge	Windsor Harbor Road Bridge	September 8, 1983 (#83001024)	Windsor Harbor Rd. at Rock Creek; 38°21′50″N 90°21′44″W	Kimmswick	

== See also ==
- List of National Historic Landmarks in Missouri
- National Register of Historic Places listings in Missouri
- Jefferson County Heritage and Historical Society of Missouri
