= Windsor High School (Imperial, Missouri) =

Windsor Senior High School

Location
- 949 Windsor Harbor Rd. Imperial, Missouri, Missouri 63052; United States; 38.3634°N 90.3688°W

Information
- School type: Public
- Established: 1922
- Principal: Rachel Montgomery
- Teaching staff: 56.59 (FTE)
- Grades: 9–12
- Gender: Co-ed
- Enrollment: 908 (2024–2025)
- Student to teacher ratio: 15.44
- Colors: Brown and Gold
- Mascot: Owl
- Newspaper: The Hoot
- Yearbook: The Harbor
- Website: www.windsorc1.com/o/whs

Windsor High School is a public high school in Imperial, Missouri, and is part of the Windsor C-1 School District.

== History ==
Windsor High School was named after a sunken Civil War gunboat that was docked in the Mississippi River in Kimmswick, Missouri. This boat was never recorded in military or naval records and could have been used as a decoy to ward off Confederate raiding parties. This ship was sunk in the late 19th century during an ice storm. The ice crushed the boat from both sides letting out a thunderous crack that woke a man living in Kimmswick who recorded the event in the local newspaper much later in his life. The boat only had the name the locals gave it, "Windsor."

According to the early history of Windsor, the school publication was named the Captain's Log, referring to the old gunboat; however, this name has since been changed to "The Vision." It was later renamed The Hoot in late 2016 as the newspaper transitioned to an online-based format.

== Academics ==
Windsor offers a wide variety of courses, including honors, dual credit, and Advanced Placement classes. The school also allows students to choose to attend Jefferson College's Area Technical School (ATS). Windsor is also one of the many schools in Missouri that take part in the A+ program, which gives scholarships to eligible students who plan to attend participating colleges.

== Athletics ==
Windsor's sports programs include: cross country, soccer, basketball, softball, football, tennis, volleyball, wrestling, track, baseball, cheerleading, dance, and golf.

== Notable alumni ==
- Nikki Ziegelmeyer, short track speed skater
