= Dana Loesch =

American conservative political commentator (born 1978)

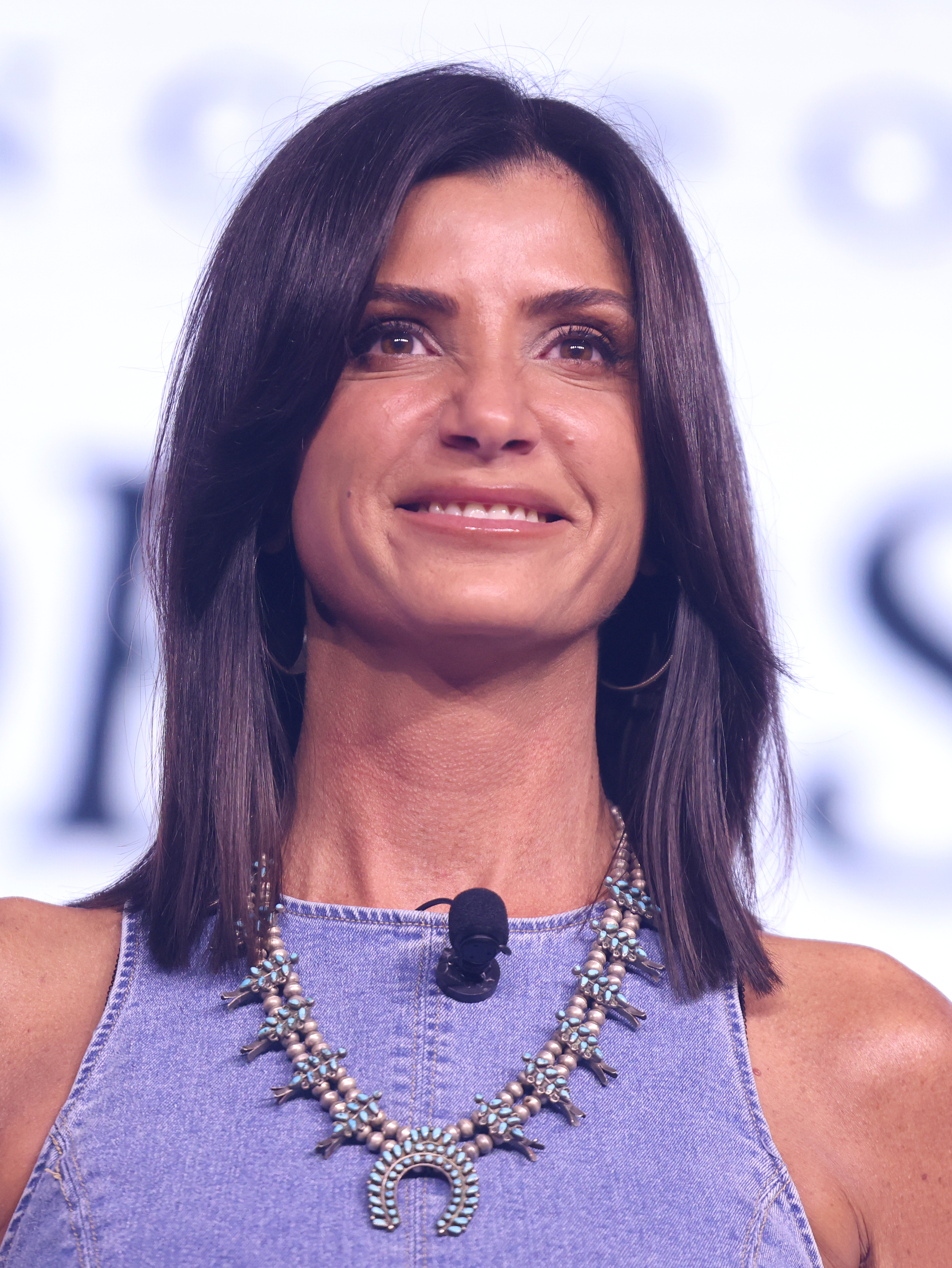
- Loesch in 2026
- Born: Dana Lynn Eaton; September 28, 1978 (age 48); Hematite, Missouri, U.S.
- Education: St. Louis Community College; Webster University
- Occupations: Commentator, radio and television host, author
- Employer(s): Audacy, Inc. Radio America
- Political party: Democratic (1996–2001); Republican (2001–present)
- Spouse: Chris Loesch (m. 2000)
- Children: 2
- Website: danaloesch.com

Dana Lynn Loesch (/læʃ/ LASH; née Eaton; born September 28, 1978) is an American radio and TV host. She is a former spokesperson for the National Rifle Association and a former writer and editor for Breitbart News. Loesch was the host of the program Dana on TheBlaze TV from 2014 to 2017. She also hosts a nationally syndicated weekday radio talk show. Loesch has appeared as a guest on television networks such as Fox News, CNN, CBS, Newsmax, ABC, and HBO.

== Early life ==
Loesch was born in Hematite, Missouri and raised by her mother, Gale, in an extended family of Southern Baptists. She claims descent from Cherokees in Georgia, who she described were "moved on the Trail of Genocide" and later listed on the Dawes Rolls. She is also of Irish descent through her paternal grandmother. She graduated from Fox High School in Arnold, Missouri. She later attended St. Louis Community College at Meramec before transferring to Webster University to study journalism. While there, she was a Democrat and worked on Bill Clinton's reelection campaign.

Following a pregnancy, Loesch dropped out of college and married, having her first child when she was 23. Loesch became disillusioned with the Democratic Party after the Clinton–Lewinsky scandal and fully rejected it after the September 11 attacks.

== Career ==
After leaving Webster University, Loesch began writing for St. Louis Magazine, doing investigative news articles, and began her website "Mamalogues". From 2006 to 2008, the St. Louis Post-Dispatch ran "Mamalogues" as a weekly online column, winning Loesch Riverfront Times' "Best Newspaper Columnist St. Louis" for 2007. Loesch started hosting her radio show in 2008; it became a nationally syndicated, daily program, The Dana Show: The Conservative Alternative, on Radio America from flagship station KFTK-FM in St. Louis. In July 2008, Loesch was chosen as one of St. Louis Business Journal's top 30 Under 30. She was recognized by the Nielsen ratings as one of the Top 50 Most Powerful Mom Bloggers. In 2009, Loesch co-founded the St. Louis Tea Party along with its board president, Bill Hennessy, but left the organization in December 2011.

In October 2010, Loesch was hired to be editor-in-chief of Big Journalism, a conservative website created by Andrew Breitbart. In February 2011, CNN hired Loesch as a political analyst in preparation for its 2012 election coverage. In 2012, Loesch was the recipient of Accuracy In Media's Grassroots Journalism award. She also guest hosted for other national radio hosts such as Glenn Beck and Michael Savage. In 2012, Loesch was added to Talkers Magazine's top 100 "heavy hitters" and was number 24 in 2017.

In January 2012, Loesch spoke on her show in defense of U.S. Marines videotaped urinating on the corpses of dead Taliban fighters, commenting that "I'd drop trou and do it, too. That's me though. I want a million cool points for these guys (Marines). Is that harsh to say?"

In December 2012, after the death of founder Andrew Breitbart earlier in the year, Loesch sued the parent company of her former employer, Breitbart LLC. Loesch claimed in court documents that owner and operator Breitbart LLC bound her to "what amounts to indentured servitude in limbo" after she said she was forced to terminate her contract as the result of a hostile working environment. She reached a non-monetary settlement with Breitbart in 2013.

In 2013, Loesch hosted the Conservative Political Action Conference (CPAC).

In May 2013, after a series of public comments back and forth between Loesch and Piers Morgan on Twitter regarding the murder of British soldier Lee Rigby, Morgan vowed to ban Loesch from his show, Piers Morgan Live. Loesch returned to the show in January 2014 after their producers, who were friends, arranged for Loesch and Morgan to work out their differences amicably.

On January 10, 2014, Loesch debuted her daily TV show, Dana, on Glenn Beck's TheBlaze TV. The show featured regulars such as author Benjamin Howe, and writer Brandon Morse. Loesch left in November 2017. In 2016, KFTK-FM in St. Louis, her original radio station, dropped her show. The show was picked up by WSDZ shortly thereafter.

During the 2016 Republican presidential primary, she endorsed the Ted Cruz campaign while disparaging the candidacy of Donald J. Trump. However, according to The Atlantic, since Trump's election Loesch became one of the Trump presidency's most visible "passionate defenders".

In 2016, Loesch labelled the mainstream media as "the rat bastards of the Earth. They are the boil on the backside of American politics ... I'm happy frankly to see them curb stomped." When the videos resurfaced after a mass shooting at the Capital Gazette newsroom in Annapolis, Maryland in 2018, Loesch said she had meant she wanted some news stories to be curb-stomped and was not encouraging violence against journalists.

=== National Rifle Association ===
In 2013, Loesch said on CNN she owned an AR-15.

Loesch appeared in NRATV advertisements (Moms like me) as early as September 2015; she held the post of special assistant to the executive vice president for public communication with the National Rifle Association (NRA) from 2017 until June 2019. She hosted The DL on NRA TV until the NRA ended production of the channel on June 25, 2019, and she has featured prominently in other NRA-produced videos.

Statements made by Loesch in advocacy for the NRA have stirred controversy, and she has received death threats as a result.

=== 2017 ===
Loesch was featured in an online video published by the National Rifle Association in April 2017. In the video, Loesch talked about an unspecified "they" and depicted protests against Donald Trump in a negative light. She went on to say, "They use their movie stars and singers and comedy shows and award shows to repeat their narrative over and over again. And then they use their ex-president to endorse the resistance ... To smash windows, burn cars, shut down interstates and airports, bully and terrorize the law-abiding – until the only option left is for the police to do their jobs and stop the madness ... The only way we stop this, the only way we save our country and our freedom, is to fight this violence of lies with the clenched fist of truth".

The video, known as "The Violence of Lies", was condemned by some commentators. DeRay Mckesson, a leader in the Black Lives Matter movement, said that the ad was "an open call to violence to protect white supremacy". Jon Favreau, a former speechwriter for President Obama, called the video "revolting and frightening". U.S. Senator Chris Murphy (D, Ct.) said, "I think the NRA is telling people to shoot us. Now might be the right time to cancel your membership." Conservative columnist Anne Applebaum said that it called on Americans "to arm themselves to fight liberals. Violence is coming". An online petition calling for the video to be removed from Facebook said, "The video tries to create an 'us-vs-them' narrative and pit Americans against one another. It paints liberals as liars and as violent, unruly protesters who law-abiding gun owners need protection from."

Loesch defended the ad, saying that it condemned rather than condoned violence. She stated, "There was nowhere in this video ... where I called for anyone to move toward violence, to silence anyone, or where I called for anyone to even pick up a firearm and enact violence."

In a second video released by the NRA in April 2017, Loesch criticized The New York Times, calling it an "old gray hag" and an "untrustworthy, dishonest rag that has subsisted on the welfare of mediocrity." She stated, "We've had it with your constant protection of your Democrat overlords, your refusal to acknowledge any truth that upsets the fragile construct that you believe is real life." Warning that her video should be considered "a shot across your proverbial bow", she concluded, "We're going to laser-focus on your so-called 'honest pursuit of truth.' In short, we're coming for you."

After the second video received increased attention in August 2017, Michael Luo, the editor of NewYorker.com, described the video as "strikingly bellicose even by the standards of the association." Press group Digital Content Next wrote a letter to Loesch in which it said, "Ninety-nine people out of a hundred would interpret this language about 'coming for' as threatening and to suggest otherwise is disingenuous at best and dangerous at worst. Bottom line: It is un-American to threaten journalists."

In October 2017, Loesch spoke in another video for the NRA, saying, "We are witnesses to the most ruthless attack on a president and the people who voted for him, and the free system that allowed it to happen, in American history." She added that critics of Trump are trying to "drive their daggers through the heart of [America's] future."

=== 2018 ===
In February 2018, Loesch said at the annual Conservative Political Action Conference, "Many in legacy media love mass shootings. You guys love it. Now I'm not saying that you love the tragedy. But I am saying that you love the ratings." She criticized the FBI's response to warnings in advance of the Stoneman Douglas High School shooting and said that the institution had become politicized. Later that month Loesch said the NRA bore no responsibility for curbing gun violence.

In March 2018, Loesch appeared in an NRA video in which she turned an hourglass and said to celebrities, politicians, and media figures, "Your time is running out. The clock starts now." She later said the video was not intended as a threat to shoot anyone.

In September 2018, she said that the police shooting of Philando Castile was justified.

In December 2018, the NRA settled a lawsuit filed against them by the artist Anish Kapoor over the 2017 video "The Violence of Lies", starring Loesch, by agreeing to remove an image of Kapoor's sculpture Cloud Gate (popularly known as "The Bean") from the film.

=== 2019 ===
In June 2019, the NRA cut ties with Ackerman McQueen, the advertising agency responsible for the production of NRA TV. Loesch subsequently lost her role as a paid spokesperson for the NRA.

=== 2021 ===
In June 2021 after Rush Limbaugh died, Loesch's radio program, which had already aired in the same time slot as The Rush Limbaugh Show during the last few years of Limbaugh's life, was picked up by several stations owned by Audacy, Inc., including her former flagship KFTK-FM in St. Louis. Radio America handles the distribution of the radio show and podcast.

=== 2022 ===
Following the August 8, 2022 FBI search of Mar-a-Lago, Loesch appeared as a guest on FOX News, where she characterized the search of the Florida residence of Donald Trump as "stunts", "nothing more than Democrats trying to settle political scores", and stated that [President] "Biden's too much of an embarrassment" to stand for the Democratic Party in the 2024 United States elections.

In October 2022, Loesch attracted press attention for a rally speech supporting Senate candidate Herschel Walker. Walker had been accused in a Daily Beast story of abetting his ex-girlfriend's abortion, the story being then reported in many notable publications. Walker denied the allegation, which had not been independently verified by other publications at the time of Loesch's speech, and announced plans for a lawsuit. Loesch's speech included the statements "I don't care if Herschel Walker paid to abort endangered baby eagles. I want control of the Senate!" and "If the Daily Beast story is true, you're telling me Walker used his money to reportedly pay some skank for an abortion, and [Sen. Raphael Warnock] wants to use all of our moneys to pay a whole bunch of skanks for abortions. So, it doesn't change anything for me!", which occasioned some commentary in the press.

== Personal life ==
In 2000, Loesch married music producer Chris Loesch. Chris became Loesch's manager. The Loesches homeschooled their two children for eight years.

== Books ==
- Loesch, Dana (2014). Hands Off My Gun: Defeating the Plot to Disarm America. Center Street. ISBN 9781455584345.
- Loesch, Dana (2016). Flyover Nation: You Can't Run a Country You've Never Been To. Sentinel. ISBN 9780399563881.
- Loesch, Dana (2020). Grace Canceled: How Outrage is Destroying Lives, Ending Debate, and Endangering Democracy. Regnery Publishing. ISBN 9781684510146.
