= Seckman High School =

American high school in Greater St. Louis, Missouri

Location
- 2800 Seckman Road; Imperial, Missouri 63052; United States; 38°23′51″N 90°25′41″W

Information
- Type: Comprehensive public high school
- Established: 1997; 29 years ago
- Principal: Trent Sauer
- Teaching staff: 102.40 (FTE)
- Enrollment: 1,766 (2023-2024)
- Student to teacher ratio: 17.25
- Colors: Blue and gold
- Athletics conference: Suburban Conference
- Nickname: Jaguars
- Website: shs.foxc6.org

Seckman High School is a public high school within the Fox C-6 School District, located in Seckman, Missouri. The school was founded in 1997 in order to meet the needs of the growing district. Seckman High School shares a campus with both Seckman Elementary and Seckman Middle School. Seckman is the sister and rival school of Fox High School in nearby Arnold.
