= Imperial, Missouri =

- Census-designated place
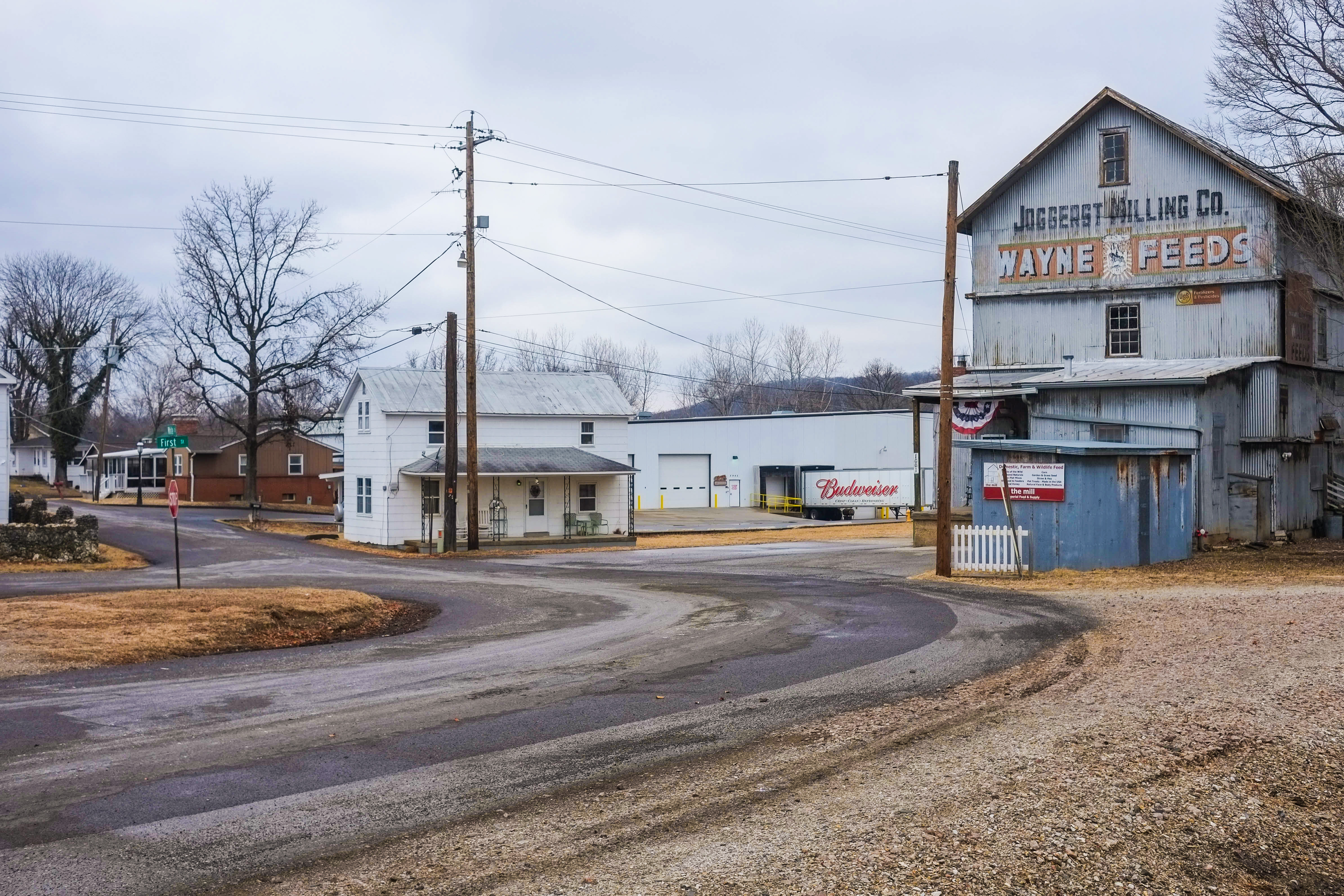
- Road in Imperial, February 2018

- Location of Imperial, Missouri
- Coordinates: 38°22′26″N 90°21′24″W
- Country: United States
- State: Missouri
- County: Jefferson

Area
  - Total: 6.03 sq mi (15.62 km^{2})
  - Land: 5.24 sq mi (13.58 km^{2})
  - Water: 0.79 sq mi (2.04 km^{2})
- Elevation: 394 ft (120 m)

Population (2020)
  - Total: 4,407
  - Density: 840.7/sq mi (324.58/km^{2})
- Time zone: UTC-6 (Central (CST))
  - Summer (DST): UTC-5 (CDT)
- ZIP code: 63052
- Area code: 636
- FIPS code: 29-34354
- GNIS feature ID: 2393061

Main Street in October 2026

Imperial is a census-designated place (CDP) in Jefferson County, Missouri, United States, and is a suburb of St. Louis. The population was 4,947 at the 2020 census. Imperial was originally known as West Kimmswick, the historic Catholic church of St. John’s in Imperial, became an independent parish in 1869.

== Geography ==
Imperial is located in northeastern Jefferson County and is bordered to the north by Arnold, to the south by Barnhart, and to the east by the Mississippi River, which forms the Illinois state line. The CDP surrounds the city of Kimmswick. Interstate 55 runs through Imperial, with access from Exits 185 (Secondary Route M) and 186 (Main Street). Mastodon State Historic Site is located in Imperial.

According to the United States Census Bureau, the CDP has a total area of 6.04 square miles (15.65 km^{2}), of which 5.25 square miles (13.61 km^{2}) are land and 0.79 square miles (2.04 km^{2}), or 13.01%, are water.

== Demographics ==
Historical population
Census	Pop.	Note	%±
2000	4,373		—
2010	4,709		7.7%
2020	4,407		−6.4%
U.S. Decennial Census

=== 2020 census ===
As of the 2020 census, Imperial had a population of 4,407. The median age was 41.6 years. 22.0% of residents were under the age of 18 and 16.1% of residents were 65 years of age or older. For every 100 females there were 108.9 males, and for every 100 females age 18 and over there were 103.8 males age 18 and over.

95.8% of residents lived in urban areas, while 4.2% lived in rural areas.

There were 1,703 households in Imperial, of which 31.5% had children under the age of 18 living in them. Of all households, 53.3% were married-couple households, 16.7% were households with a male householder and no spouse or partner present, and 23.0% were households with a female householder and no spouse or partner present. About 23.6% of all households were made up of individuals and 9.9% had someone living alone who was 65 years of age or older.

There were 1,817 housing units, of which 6.3% were vacant. The homeowner vacancy rate was 1.4% and the rental vacancy rate was 10.5%.

Racial composition as of the 2020 census
Race	Number	Percent
White	4,002	90.8%
Black or African American	25	0.6%
American Indian and Alaska Native	16	0.4%
Asian	66	1.5%
Native Hawaiian and Other Pacific Islander	2	0.0%
Some other race	25	0.6%
Two or more races	271	6.1%
Hispanic or Latino (of any race)	86	2.0%

=== 2010 census ===
As of the census of 2010, there were 4,709 people, 1,769 households, and 1,297 families living in the CDP. The population density was 895.2 inhabitants per square mile (345.6/km^{2}). There were 1,871 housing units at an average density of 355.7 per square mile (137.3/km^{2}). The racial makeup of the CDP was 97.5% White, 0.3% African American, 0.3% Native American, 1.1% Asian, 0.1% from other races, and 0.8% from two or more races. Hispanic or Latino of any race were 1.2% of the population.

There were 1,769 households, of which 36.2% had children under the age of 18 living with them, 58.0% were married couples living together, 9.6% had a female householder with no husband present, 5.7% had a male householder with no wife present, and 26.7% were non-families. 21.3% of all households were made up of individuals, and 6.9% had someone living alone who was 65 years of age or older. The average household size was 2.66 and the average family size was 3.08.

The median age in the CDP was 38 years. 24.8% of residents were under the age of 18; 8.1% were between the ages of 18 and 24; 27.2% were from 25 to 44; 29.3% were from 45 to 64; and 10.6% were 65 years of age or older. The gender makeup of the CDP was 50.9% male and 49.1% female.

=== 2000 census ===
As of the census of 2000, there were 4,373 people, 1,634 households, and 1,228 families living in the CDP. The population density was 812.4 inhabitants per square mile (313.7/km^{2}). There were 1,720 housing units at an average density of 319.5 per square mile (123.4/km^{2}). The racial makeup of the CDP was 97.92% White, 0.14% African American, 0.14% Native American, 0.34% Asian, 0.02% Pacific Islander, 0.11% from other races, and 1.33% from two or more races. Hispanic or Latino of any race were 1.17% of the population.

There were 1,634 households, out of which 38.7% had children under the age of 18 living with them, 59.7% were married couples living together, 10.3% had a female householder with no husband present, and 24.8% were non-families. 20.3% of all households were made up of individuals, and 6.7% had someone living alone who was 65 years of age or older. The average household size was 2.67 and the average family size was 3.06.

In the CDP, the population was spread out, with 27.6% under the age of 18, 8.3% from 18 to 24, 34.1% from 25 to 44, 21.5% from 45 to 64, and 8.5% who were 65 years of age or older. The median age was 34 years. For every 100 females, there were 100.6 males. For every 100 females age 18 and over, there were 93.4 males.

The median income for a household in the CDP was $49,565, and the median income for a family was $58,955. Males had a median income of $39,292 versus $30,191 for females. The per capita income for the CDP was $20,431. About 4.9% of families and 9.8% of the population were below the poverty line, including 13.7% of those under age 18 and 8.9% of those age 65 or over.

== Education ==
Almost all of the Imperial CDP is in the Windsor C-1 School District. A small portion of the CDP and several surrounding areas with Imperial addresses are zoned to the Fox C-6 School District. The Windsor district operates Windsor High School in the CDP. Fox C-6 operates Seckman High School outside of the CDP.

The Windsor district previously ended at the eighth grade. High school students would attend Crystal City High School or Herculaneum High School. The Fox district was originally a K-8 school district, with high school students also having a choice of Crystal City High and Herculaneum High. The Fox district became K-12 when Fox High School was established in 1955.
