= Barnhart, Missouri =

- CDP
- Barnhart in October 2026

- Location of Barnhart, Missouri
- Coordinates: 38°20′09″N 90°24′16″W
- Country: United States
- State: Missouri
- County: Jefferson

Area
  - Total: 5.26 sq mi (13.62 km^{2})
  - Land: 5.10 sq mi (13.21 km^{2})
  - Water: 0.16 sq mi (0.41 km^{2})
- Elevation: 554 ft (169 m)

Population (2020)
  - Total: 5,832
  - Density: 1,143.4/sq mi (441.45/km^{2})
- Time zone: UTC-6 (Central (CST))
  - Summer (DST): UTC-5 (CDT)
- ZIP code: 63012
- Area code: 636
- FIPS code: 29-03394
- GNIS feature ID: 2393328

Barnhart is a census-designated place (CDP) in Jefferson County, Missouri, United States. As of the 2020 census, Barnhart had a population of 5,832. Barnhart is also a suburb of St. Louis.

== History ==
The land surrounding Barnhart originally belonged to Benjamin O'Fallon, who settled here with his family in 1834. The James O'Fallon Home was built in 1860, and was purchased in 1884 by Joseph G. Marriott, a cattle rancher who introducing the first Holstein cattle to Jefferson County. The extant home is now called the Parkton Mansion. The town was not named until after the Frisco Railroad was completed in the early 1900s, and may have been named for Mrs. C. L. Barnhart, who donated land for the Frisco Railroad Depot.

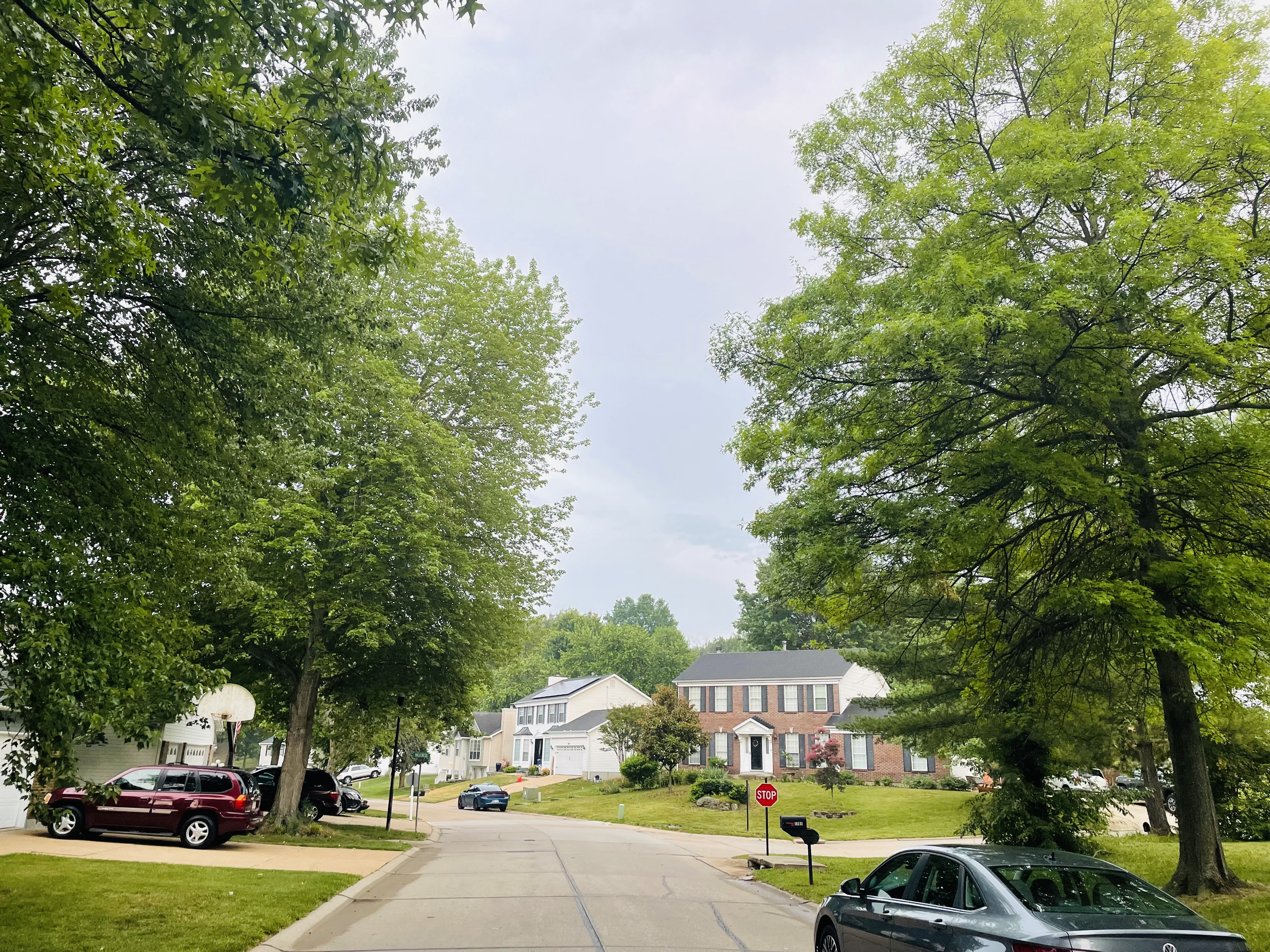
A residential street in Barnhart.

== Geography ==
According to the United States Census Bureau, the CDP has a total area of 5.25 square miles (13.60 km^{2}), of which 5.09 square miles (13.18 km^{2}) is land and 0.16 square miles (0.41 km^{2}) is water.

== Demographics ==
Historical population
Census	Pop.	Note	%±
2000	6,108		—
2010	5,682		−7.0%
2020	5,832		2.6%
U.S. Decennial Census

=== 2020 census ===
As of the 2020 census, Barnhart had a population of 5,832. The median age was 35.5 years. 27.0% of residents were under the age of 18 and 12.4% of residents were 65 years of age or older. For every 100 females there were 102.3 males, and for every 100 females age 18 and over there were 100.7 males age 18 and over.

94.1% of residents lived in urban areas, while 5.9% lived in rural areas.

There were 1,993 households in Barnhart, of which 39.8% had children under the age of 18 living in them. Of all households, 58.4% were married-couple households, 14.3% were households with a male householder and no spouse or partner present, and 18.4% were households with a female householder and no spouse or partner present. About 15.8% of all households were made up of individuals and 6.6% had someone living alone who was 65 years of age or older.

There were 2,051 housing units, of which 2.8% were vacant. The homeowner vacancy rate was 1.2% and the rental vacancy rate was 4.6%.

Racial composition as of the 2020 census
Race	Number	Percent
White	5,339	91.5%
Black or African American	25	0.4%
American Indian and Alaska Native	9	0.2%
Asian	23	0.4%
Native Hawaiian and Other Pacific Islander	3	0.1%
Some other race	27	0.5%
Two or more races	406	7.0%
Hispanic or Latino (of any race)	147	2.5%

=== 2010 census ===
As of the census of 2010, there were 5,682 people, 1,920 households, and 1,576 families living in the CDP. The population density was 1,116.3 inhabitants per square mile (431.0/km^{2}). There were 2,003 housing units at an average density of 393.5 per square mile (151.9/km^{2}). The racial makeup of the CDP was 97.4% White, 0.5% African American, 0.3% Native American, 0.4% Asian, 0.3% from other races, and 1.1% from two or more races. Hispanic or Latino of any race were 2.1% of the population.

There were 1,920 households, of which 44.0% had children under the age of 18 living with them, 65.3% were married couples living together, 10.8% had a female householder with no husband present, 6.0% had a male householder with no wife present, and 17.9% were non-families. 12.6% of all households were made up of individuals, and 2.7% had someone living alone who was 65 years of age or older. The average household size was 2.93 and the average family size was 3.17.

The median age in the CDP was 34.5 years. 27.6% of residents were under the age of 18; 8.1% were between the ages of 18 and 24; 28.8% were from 25 to 44; 28.5% were from 45 to 64; and 6.9% were 65 years of age or older. The gender makeup of the CDP was 50.4% male and 49.6% female.

=== 2000 census ===
As of the census of 2000, there were 6,108 people, 1,962 households, and 1,663 families living in the CDP. The population density was 1,188.5 inhabitants per square mile (458.9/km^{2}). There were 1,999 housing units at an average density of 389.0 per square mile (150.2/km^{2}). The racial makeup of the CDP was 97.82% White, 0.36% African American, 0.13% Native American, 0.38% Asian, 0.02% Pacific Islander, 0.34% from other races, and 0.95% from two or more races. Hispanic or Latino of any race were 1.47% of the population.

There were 1,962 households, out of which 48.8% had children under the age of 18 living with them, 70.8% were married couples living together, 9.1% had a female householder with no husband present, and 15.2% were non-families. 11.2% of all households were made up of individuals, and 2.1% had someone living alone who was 65 years of age or older. The average household size was 3.08 and the average family size was 3.31.

In the CDP, the population was spread out, with 30.9% under the age of 18, 8.8% from 18 to 24, 34.4% from 25 to 44, 20.8% from 45 to 64, and 5.1% who were 65 years of age or older. The median age was 32 years. For every 100 females, there were 103.7 males. For every 100 females age 18 and over, there were 100.0 males.

The median income for a household in the CDP was $56,559, and the median income for a family was $59,189. Males had a median income of $41,758 versus $28,630 for females. The per capita income for the CDP was $20,940. About 0.9% of families and 2.6% of the population were below the poverty line, including none of those under age 18 and 6.5% of those age 65 or over.

== Arts and culture ==
Barnhart has a public library, a branch of the Jefferson County Library.

== Education ==
Most of the Barnhart CDP is in the Windsor C-1 School District, while a portion of the CDP is in the Fox C-6 School District. A southwestern portion of the wider Barnhart area is assigned to the Dunklin R-V School District.

The Windsor district previously ended at the eighth grade. High school students would attend Crystal City High School or Herculaneum High School. The Fox district was originally a K-8 school district, with high school students also having a choice of Crystal City High and Herculaneum High. The Fox district became K-12 when Fox High School was established in 1955.
