= Fox C-6 School District =

School district in Missouri, U.S.

Address
- 745 Jeffco Boulevard Arnold, Missouri, 63010; United States

District information
- Type: Public
- Grades: PreK–12
- NCES District ID: 2912300

Students and staff
- Students: 11,022
- Teachers: 777.93
- Staff: 327.74
- Student–teacher ratio: 14.17

Other information
- Website: www.foxc6.org

Fox C-6 School District is a school district headquartered in Arnold, Missouri in Greater St. Louis. The district serves northeastern Jefferson County, including suburban areas to the north and rural areas to the south. The district serves Arnold and several unincorporated areas, including portions of Barnhart and Imperial. As of 2014, the district has almost 12,000 students, while about 65,000 people total live within the district boundaries. It is the largest school district in Jefferson County.

== History ==
The Fox Consolidated School District formed in 1948 when the Bowen, Lone Dell, Saline, Seckman, and Soulard one-room school houses consolidated. All students were consolidated into the Fox School, which is the current Fox Middle School. Charles Fox sold the land on which the original Fox School building was constructed to the proposed school district. The district and the original school building are named in his honor. Since the five original schools were no longer being used, playground equipment was obtained from each of the schools. The district was originally a K-8 school district, with high school students having a choice of Crystal City High School and Herculaneum High School. The district became K-12 when Fox High School was established in 1955. The Antonia School District was consolidated into the Fox district in 1970.

In 2013, the district hired Kelly Nash, the daughter in law of the president of the school board, Linda Nash, as its food services director; Kelly Nash was previously an assistant manager at a McDonald's. Due to the criticism, the district enacted an anti-nepotism policy.

In May 2014, a group of parents, who had criticized school-district policies, accused district administrators of posting defamatory comments about the parents on the Topix public forum. The group of parents subpoenaed Topix to obtain the poster's IP addresses and then filed court orders with AT&T and Charter Communications to obtain the identities associated with the IP addresses. In June 2014, the parents filed a libel suit against district officials. The district revealed the names of the accused administrators, who were placed on administrative leave. Superintendent Dianne Critchlow was one of the individuals put on leave, and the district began a search for a new superintendent. The school board accepted Critchlow's resignation effective October 31, 2014, hired an interim superintendent, and fired Critchlow's husband.

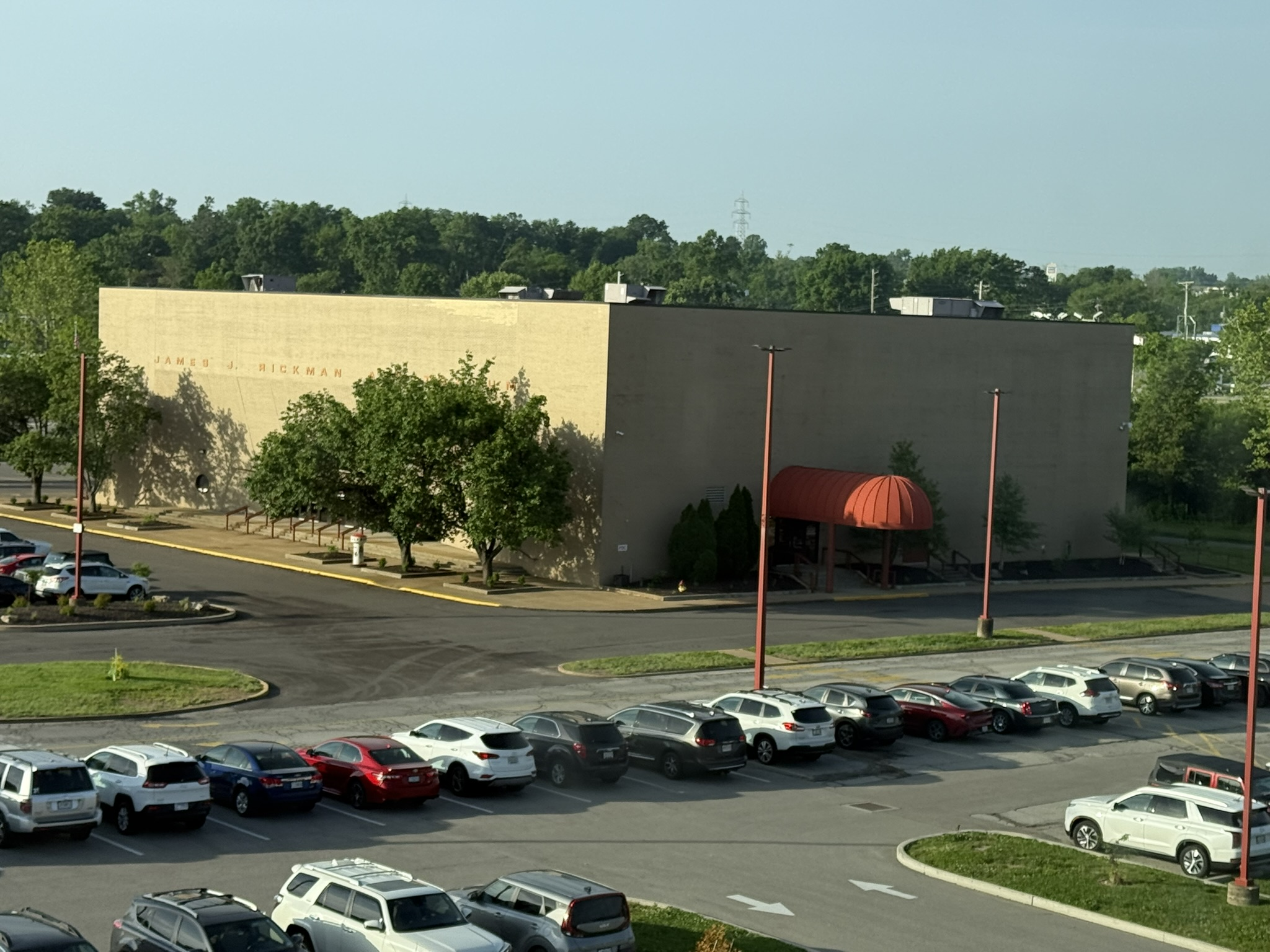
Rickman Auditorium in Arnold, MO May 15, 2025

== James J. Rickman Auditorium ==
Built in 1986, the Rickman Auditorium is located on the Fox Campus. The Auditorium boasts over 1,400 seats and welcomes over 100,000 visitors every year. The auditorium serves the needs of the many events hosted by all of the schools in the district. In addition, the auditorium has also hosted many concerts and community events over the years. The Rickman Auditorium is home to Fox High School's Theater Troupe, which has hosted shows like Legally Blonde, High School Musical, and more.

=== Past Managers ===
Past Managers
| Name | Start Date | End Date |
|---|---|---|
| Trey Jimenez | 17th of August, 2021 | Present |
| Timothy Becker | 2013, Unknown | 2020, Unknown |
| Unknown | Unknown | Unknown |
| Unknown | Unknown | Unknown |

== Schools ==
=== High schools ===
- Fox High School (Arnold)
- Seckman High School (Imperial)

=== Middle schools ===
- Antonia Middle School (Unincorporated area near Barnhart)
- Fox Middle School (Arnold)
- Ridgewood Middle School (Unincorporated area near Arnold)
- Seckman Middle School (Unincorporated area, Imperial)

=== Elementary schools ===
- Antonia Elementary School (Unincorporated area near Imperial)
- Fox Elementary School (Arnold)
- George Guffey Elementary School (Unincorporated area near Fenton)
- Clyde Hamrick Elementary School (Unincorporated area near Imperial)
- Ray and Nancy Hodge Elementary School (Unincorporated area near Imperial)
- Lone Dell Elementary School (Unincorporated area near Arnold)
- Meramec Heights Elementary School (Unincorporated area near Arnold)
- Rockport Heights Elementary School (Arnold)
- Seckman Elementary School (Unincorporated area, Imperial)
- Sherwood Elementary School (Arnold)
- Richard A. Simpson Elementary School (Unincorporated area near Arnold)

=== Early childhood ===
- Don Earl Early Childhood Learning Center (Arnold)
