= Austin Romaine =

American football player (born 2004)

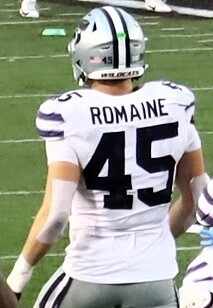
- Romaine in 2024

No. 15 – Texas Tech Red Raiders
- Position: Linebacker
- Class: Senior

Personal information
- Born: September 3, 2004 (age 22); Hillsboro, Missouri, U.S.
- Listed height: 6 ft 2 in (1.88 m)
- Listed weight: 240 lb (109 kg)

Career information
- High school: Hillsboro (Hillsboro, Missouri)
- College: Kansas State (2023–2025); Texas Tech (2026–present)

Awards and highlights
- 2× Second-team All-Big 12 (2024, 2025)
- Stats at ESPN

Austin Romaine (born September 3, 2004) is an American college football linebacker for the Texas Tech Red Raiders. He previously played for the Kansas State Wildcats.

== Early life ==
Romaine attended Hillsboro High School in Hillsboro, Missouri, where he played linebacker and running back. As a senior, he had 117 tackles and seven sacks on defense and rushed for 1,171 yards. For his high school career, he rushed for 3,196 yards and 45 touchdowns. Romaine committed to Kansas State University to play college football.

== College career ==
As a true freshman at Kansas State in 2023, Romaine played in 12 games with five starts and recorded 22 tackles and one sack. As a sophomore in 2024, he recorded 96 tackles and three sacks.
