= Jefferson College (Missouri) =

Community college in Hillsboro, Missouri, US

- Type: Public community college
- Established: April 2, 1963; 63 years ago
- Accreditation: HLC
- President: Dena McCaffrey
- Students: 3,573 (fall 2026)
- Location: Hillsboro, Missouri, United States; 38°15′36″N 90°33′35″W
- Campus: 400 acres (160 ha)
- Colors: Red and reflex blue
- Nickname: Vikings
- Sporting affiliations: NJCAA – MCCAC
- Mascot: Victor the Viking
- Website: www.jeffco.edu

Jefferson College is a community college in Hillsboro, Missouri, serving Jefferson County and the surrounding region. The college offers associate degrees, certificate programs, career and technical education, workforce training, and transfer pathways to four-year colleges and universities through on-campus and online instruction.

== History ==
The history of Jefferson College began in the spring of 1961 with the passage of Senate Bill Number Seven, presented by Senator Earl Blackwell of Hillsboro, making possible the formation and financing of public junior colleges in Missouri. Several Jefferson County citizens began to recognize the need for a public junior college in their community. They met, organized, and petitioned the State Board of Education for the formation of a Junior College District. The Community College District of Jefferson County was voted into existence on April 2, 1963.

Classes were first held at Hillsboro High School in 1964 until the following year, 1965, when the college moved to its present 400-acre campus on Highway 21 near Hillsboro. Jefferson College became the second junior college district to be approved in Missouri.

== Campus locations ==
=== Main Campus ===
Jefferson College's main campus is located in the city of Hillsboro in Jefferson County on approximately 400 acres and is about 30 miles (48 km) south of St. Louis.

Campus facilities include academic classroom buildings, science and technology laboratories and the Area Technical School, which provides career-focused programs for area high school students. The campus also features a dedicated Veterinary Technology Building.

Additional facilities include the Student Center, which houses admissions, financial aid, advising, and other student services; the Jefferson College Library; the Fine Arts Center, which hosts theatrical productions, concerts, and art exhibitions; and the Field House, which supports athletics and recreational activities. Viking Woods provides on-campus student housing in apartment-style accommodations.

The Hillsboro campus also serves as a venue for community events, sporting events, education programs and cultural activities throughout the year.

=== Jefferson College Arnold ===
Jefferson College Arnold, located at 1687 Missouri State Road in Arnold, opened in 2007 to serve northern Jefferson County and surrounding communities. It is behind the Arnold Library and Recreation Center, about 5 miles (8.0 km) south of St. Louis.

This location offers associate degree and certificate programs, general education courses, and career and technical training, including emergency medical services, law enforcement, biotechnology, business, and education.

A major expansion and renovation in 2024 added specialized training facilities, upgraded science laboratories, and improved classrooms and student spaces. The location also provides academic advising, financial aid assistance, tutoring, and other student support services.

=== Jefferson College Imperial (closed) ===
Jefferson College Imperial, formerly located at 4400 Jeffco Boulevard in Imperial, closed in 2024. The Law Enforcement Academy and EMT-Paramedic programs were relocated to Jefferson College Arnold following expansions and upgrades that provided enhanced training spaces for both programs.

== Academics ==
Jefferson College is accredited by the Higher Learning Commission and offers five associate degrees and several career and technical education certificates.

The Associate of Arts (A.A.), Associate of Arts in Teaching (A.A.T.), Associate of Fine Arts (A.F.A.), and Associate of Science (A.S.) degrees are designed primarily for students planning to transfer to four-year colleges or universities to pursue bachelor's degrees. These programs support academic pathways in general studies, education, fine arts, biology, chemistry, and engineering.

The Associate of Applied Science (A.A.S.) degree focuses on career preparation through a combination of practical training and theoretical coursework, preparing students for entry-level employment in specialized fields.

Jefferson College also offers early college opportunities to students attending high schools throughout Jefferson County, allowing them to earn college credit while completing their high school education. Participation in these programs has grown over time.

Approximately 23% of Jefferson College students participate in Missouri's A+ Scholarship Program, which provides eligible students with financial assistance toward tuition and general fees at participating community colleges and technical schools.

=== Community education and workforce development ===
The college offers community education, workforce development, and adult learning programs. Through Workforce and Employment Services, the college provides advanced career training, job-search assistance and résumé reviews.

The college's Adult Education and Literacy (AEL) program provides educational services for adults seeking to improve foundational academic skills, earn high school equivalency credentials, or prepare for further education and employment. The program has been ranked first in Missouri for Measurable Skill gains, a performance indicator used to assess educational progress in adult education programs.

Jefferson College also offers youth educational programs designed to introduce students to career and technical fields. These include From Tutus to Tool Belts, a program that introduces young participants to skilled trades and career opportunities.

== Athletics ==
Jefferson College's athletic teams are known as the Vikings and compete in the National Junior College Athletic Association (NJCAA) Region XVI. The college offers men's, women's, and co-ed athletic programs, competing at various NJCAA divisional levels depending on the sport.

Men's Sports

- Baseball (Division I)
- Basketball (Division II)
- Soccer (Division I)

Women's Sports

- Basketball (Division II)
- Soccer (Division II)
- Softball (Division I)
- Volleyball (Division I)

Co-ed Sports

- Cross Country (Division III)
- Esports (NJCAAE)
- Cheer

== Jefferson College Foundation ==
The Jefferson College Foundation is a 501(c)(3) organization established in 1991 to support the college's educational mission. The Foundation provides scholarships and grants to students through contributions from alumni, businesses, and community members. Funding also supports academic programs, instructional technology, faculty initiatives, and campus improvements.

In addition to scholarships, the Foundation provides emergency assistance to students experiencing unexpected financial hardships, including challenges related to housing, childcare, and other essential expenses.

== Student life ==
Victor the Viking is the mascot of Jefferson College.

=== Student media ===
Jefferson College Studios (JC Studios) provides students with hands-on educational opportunities in broadcasting, journalism, digital media, and content production. Students gain practical experience creating podcasts, producing videos for YouTube, and developing content for social media platforms.

=== Student clubs and organizations ===
Jefferson College offers a variety of student clubs and organizations focused on academic, professional, cultural, recreational, and community service interests. These organizations provide opportunities for students to participate in campus activities, develop leadership skills, and engage with the college community.

Student organizations include the Student Senate, Black Student Union, Phi Theta Kappa Honor Society, National Society of Leadership and Success, Aspiring Educators, Psychology Club, Student Nurse Club, Radiology Tech Club, and the Multicultural Club.

== Library ==
Jefferson College Library serves the students, faculty, and staff of the college, as well as residents of Jefferson County. The two-story building underwent renovations in 2018 to update its study, research, and gathering spaces. Many services and materials are available online and in-person, including technology and research assistance, extensive digital and print collections, open seating areas and bookable rooms, digital preservation equipment, and unique events and programming. The Library houses the Jefferson County History Center and Archives, which serves as an archive for 19th-century circuit court records, county probate files, and other historical materials used for genealogical and local history research. Jefferson College Library is an FDLP Selective Depository for U.S. Government documents and information. A small collection of print publications from the Government Publishing Office is available at the Library and assistance with finding government information is provided.

== Notable alumni ==
- Danielle Adams, WNBA player
- Gideon Antle, baseball player for the Loco Beach Coconuts
- Scott Bakula, actor known for roles in Quantum Leap, Star Trek: Enterprise, and NCIS: New Orleans
