= 2022 Jefferson County, Missouri Executive election =

- November 8, 2022

Nominee	Dennis Gannon	Fran Newkirk
Party	Republican	Democratic
Popular vote	53,634	23,560
Percentage	69.48%	30.52%
County Executive before election
Dennis Gannon
Republican
Elected County Executive
Dennis Gannon
Republican

The 2022 Jefferson County, Missouri Executive election took place on November 8, 2022. Incumbent Republican County Executive Dennis Gannon ran for re-election to a second term. He was challenged by State Senator Paul Wieland in the Republican primary, and won renomination by a wide margin. In the general election, Gannon faced Democratic nominee Fran Newkirk, who previously served on several special districts in Antonia. Gannon won re-election in a landslide, receiving 69 percent of the vote to Newkirk's 31 percent.

== Democratic primary ==
=== Candidates ===
- Fran Newkirk, former member of the Antonia Fire Protection District and the Public Water Supply District C-1 Board

=== Results ===
Democratic primary results
Party	Candidate	Votes	%
Democratic	Fran Newkirk	9,403	100.00%
Total votes		9,403	100.00%

== Republican primary ==
=== Candidates ===
- Dennis Gannon, incumbent County Executive
- Paul Weiland, State Senator

=== Results ===
Republican primary results
Party	Candidate	Votes	%
Republican	Dennis Gannon (inc.)	15,120	55.68%
Republican	Paul Wieland	12,033	44.32%
Total votes		27,153	100.00%

== General election ==
=== Results ===
2022 Jefferson County Executive election
Party	Candidate	Votes	%
Republican	Dennis Gannon (inc.)	53,634	69.48%
Democratic	Fran Newkirk	23,560	30.52%
Total votes		77,194	100.00%
Republican hold			
