= Horine, Missouri =

- Census-designated place
- Location of Horine, Missouri
- Coordinates: 38°16′01″N 90°25′56″W
- Country: United States
- State: Missouri
- County: Jefferson

Area
  - Total: 0.72 sq mi (1.86 km^{2})
  - Land: 0.71 sq mi (1.85 km^{2})
  - Water: 0.0077 sq mi (0.02 km^{2})
- Elevation: 502 ft (153 m)

Population (2020)
  - Total: 657
  - Density: 922.2/sq mi (356.07/km^{2})
- Time zone: UTC-6 (Central (CST))
  - Summer (DST): UTC-5 (CDT)
- ZIP code: 63070
- Area code: 636
- FIPS code: 29-33040
- GNIS feature ID: 2393054

Horine is an unincorporated community and census-designated place (CDP) in Jefferson County, Missouri, United States. As of the 2020 census, Horine had a population of 657.

== History ==
Horine was platted in 1868, and named after C. Thomas Horine, an early settler. A post office called "Horine Station" was established in 1862, the name was changed to "Horine" in 1916, and the post office closed in 1942.

== Geography ==
Horine is located in eastern Jefferson County and is bordered to the northeast by the city of Pevely, to the northwest by Route Z, and to the south by Joachim Creek, a direct tributary of the Mississippi River.

According to the United States Census Bureau, the Horine CDP has a total area of 0.76 square miles (1.96 km^{2}), of which 0.75 square miles (1.94 km^{2}) are land and 0.01 square miles (0.02 km^{2}), or 0.98%, are water. The CDP area has decreased slightly since 2000, due to some annexation by the city of Pevely.

== Demographics ==
Historical population
Census	Pop.	Note	%±
2000	923		—
2010	821		−11.1%
2020	657		−20.0%
U.S. Decennial Census

As of the census of 2000, there were 923 people, 335 households, and 254 families residing in the CDP. The population density was 1,112.2 inhabitants per square mile (429.4/km^{2}). There were 355 housing units at an average density of 427.8 per square mile (165.2/km^{2}). The racial makeup of the CDP was 97.83% White, 0.87% African American, 0.22% Native American, 0.11% Asian, and 0.98% from two or more races. Hispanic or Latino of any race were 0.76% of the population.

There were 335 households, out of which 34.3% had children under the age of 18 living with them, 61.8% were married couples living together, 9.3% had a female householder with no husband present, and 23.9% were non-families. 19.7% of all households were made up of individuals, and 6.0% had someone living alone who was 65 years of age or older. The average household size was 2.76 and the average family size was 3.15.

In the CDP, the population was spread out, with 24.3% under the age of 18, 10.0% from 18 to 24, 31.9% from 25 to 44, 24.8% from 45 to 64, and 9.1% who were 65 years of age or older. The median age was 36 years. For every 100 females, there were 108.8 males. For every 100 females age 18 and over, there were 113.1 males.

The median income for a household in the CDP was $41,676, and the median income for a family was $41,593. Males had a median income of $37,009 versus $20,417 for females. The per capita income for the CDP was $17,366. About 3.4% of families and 3.7% of the population were below the poverty line, including none of those under the age of eighteen or sixty-five or over.

== Education ==
Dunklin R-V School District serves Horine.
