= Windsor C-1 School District =

School district in Missouri, U.S.

Address
- 6208 US Highway 61-67 Imperial, Missouri, 63052; United States

District information
- Type: Public
- Grades: PreK–12
- NCES District ID: 2932100

Students and staff
- Students: 2,995
- Teachers: 210.51
- Staff: 77.49
- Student–teacher ratio: 14.23

Other information
- Website: www.windsorc1.com

The Windsor C-1 School District is a school district headquartered in Imperial, Missouri in Greater St. Louis.

The district serves areas in northern Jefferson County, including most of the Imperial CDP, most of Barnhart, and all of Kimmswick. The district is about 25 miles (40 km) south of St. Louis.

== History ==
The Consolidated District Number One of Jefferson County Missouri was established on February 25, 1922, when voters at a meeting at the White School voted 205–82 to consolidate several school districts. The consolidation included the Barnhart, Kimmswick, Sulphur Springs, and White school districts. Portions of the Moss Hollow and Seckman school districts were also consolidated into the new district. The district previously ended at the eighth grade. High school students would attend Crystal City High School or Herculaneum High School. On December 12, 1938, the district board of directors voted to name the district school the Windsor School after the Windsor gunboat in the U.S. Civil War.

== Schools ==
- Windsor High School (9–12)
- Windsor Middle School (6–8)
- Windsor Intermediate Center (3–5) - It serves students in grades 3–5 in the Windsor Elementary zone and students in grades 3-5 from the Freer Elementary zone
- James E. Freer Elementary School (PreK-2)
- Windsor Elementary School (PreK-2)

Freer is in Barnhart and other schools are in Imperial.
