= Mike Wells (defensive lineman) =

American football player (born 1971)

Missouri Baptist Spartans
- Title: Defensive line coach

Personal information
- Born: June 1, 1971 (age 55); Arnold, Missouri, U.S.
- Listed height: 6 ft 3 in (1.91 m)
- Listed weight: 325 lb (147 kg)

Career information
- Position: Defensive tackle (No. 95, 97)
- High school: Fox (Arnold)
- College: Iowa
- NFL draft: 1994: 4th round, 125th overall pick

Career history

Playing
- Minnesota Vikings (1994)*; Detroit Lions (1994–1997); Chicago Bears (1998–2000); Indianapolis Colts (2001)
- * Offseason or practice squad member only

Coaching
- Missouri Baptist (2026–present) Defensive line coach

Awards and highlights
- 2× First-team All-Big Ten (1992, 1993)

Career NFL statistics
- Tackles: 303
- Sacks: 6.5
- Interceptions: 1
- Stats at Pro Football Reference

Michael Allan Wells (born June 1, 1971) is an American college football coach and former professional defensive lineman who played in the National Football League (NFL). He is the defensive line coach for Missouri Baptist University, a position he has held since 2026. He played college football for the Iowa Hawkeyes and was selected by the Minnesota Vikings in the fourth round of the 1994 NFL draft.

He has also played for the Detroit Lions, Chicago Bears, and the Indianapolis Colts.

== Early life ==
Wells attended Arnold (MO) Fox where he was a Parade, USA Today and Prep Report first-team All-American in 1988, as well as being named USA Today's all-sports Missouri state Athlete-of-the-Year, SuperPrep Midlands Defensive Player of the Year, and the St. Louis Post-Dispatch College Prospect of the Year. For his high school career, he recorded 411 tackles and nine fumble recoveries. He also won the state discus title as sophomore and senior.

== College career ==
=== 1989 ===
Redshirted. He was the scout team defensive MVP vs. Wisconsin.

=== 1990 ===
Wells started the final two regular season games and three total at nose guard. He was fourth among the down lineman with 48 tackles and tied for third on the team with 6 tackles for loss while helping the Hawkeyes lead the Big Ten in rushing defense and total defense. He was named Honorable Mention All-Big Ten.

=== 1991 ===
Wells played in eleven games and started seven at right tackle for a defensive unit that led the Big Ten in total defense. He was fourth on team in tackles and third in the conference with 11 sacks (second only to teammate Leroy Smith in sacks) for minus 60 yards and fifth in tackles for losses with 14 for minus 65 yards. He was named to sophomore All-America team by Football News.

=== 1992 ===
Wells set career highs in every significant defensive category except for sacks (9) as a redshirt junior. He was named 1st-Team All-Big Ten and was the co-winner of the Roy J. Carver MVP Award.

=== 1993 ===
Being named a team captain before the season, Wells was named an All-Big Ten first-team selection by the media for the second time and second-team by coaches. He started all twelve games at defensive tackle. With his monster season, he now holds Iowa's career records for tackles for loss (54-223) and QB sacks (33-190) while finishing with 309 career tackles and placing third on the team with 64 solo tackles and 37 assists for 101 total. He also recovered one fumble, broke up six passes, and returned an interception 28 yards in a win over Minnesota. He was the co-winner of the Roy J. Carver MVP Award for the second time.

== Professional career ==
Despite being drafted in the fourth round, Wells was released by the Minnesota Vikings before the 1994 season began. He was quickly picked up by the Detroit Lions, where he played primarily as a backup until 1997, his last season with the team, where he started all sixteen games. He was signed as an unrestricted free agent that off-season by the Chicago Bears. He led the team in tackles in each of his three seasons with the squad. Despite this and the fact that he was willing to take a pay cut, he was released in favor of recent free-agent acquisitions Ted Washington and Keith Traylor. Wells later signed with the Indianapolis Colts, where he played for one season before deciding to retire.

== NFL career statistics ==
Legend
| | Led the league |
| **Bold** | Career high |

=== Regular season ===
| Year | Team | Games | | Tackles | | | | Interceptions | | | | Fumbles | | | |
| Year | Team | GP | GS | Comb | Solo | Ast | Sck | Int | Yds | TD | Lng | FF | FR | Yds | TD |
|---|---|---|---|---|---|---|---|---|---|---|---|---|---|---|---|
| 1994 | DET | 4 | 0 | 0 | 0 | 0 | 0.0 | 0 | 0 | 0 | 0 | 0 | 0 | 0 | 0 |
| 1995 | DET | 15 | 0 | 6 | 3 | 3 | 0.5 | 0 | 0 | 0 | 0 | 0 | 0 | 0 | 0 |
| 1996 | DET | 16 | 1 | 30 | 16 | 14 | 0.0 | 0 | 0 | 0 | 0 | 0 | **1** | 0 | **1** |
| 1997 | DET | 16 | 16 | 66 | 30 | **36** | 1.0 | 0 | 0 | 0 | 0 | 0 | **1** | 0 | 0 |
| 1998 | CHI | 16 | 16 | 61 | 45 | 16 | **3.0** | 0 | 0 | 0 | 0 | 0 | 0 | 0 | 0 |
| 1999 | CHI | 16 | 16 | **68** | **51** | 17 | 1.0 | 0 | 0 | 0 | 0 | **1** | **1** | 0 | 0 |
| 2000 | CHI | 16 | 14 | 49 | 32 | 17 | 1.0 | **1** | **21** | 0 | **21** | 0 | 0 | 0 | 0 |
| 2001 | IND | 16 | 0 | 23 | 15 | 8 | 0.0 | 0 | 0 | 0 | 0 | 0 | 0 | 0 | 0 |
| | | 115 | 63 | 303 | 192 | 111 | 6.5 | 1 | 21 | 0 | 21 | 1 | 3 | 0 | 1 |

=== Playoffs ===
| Year | Team | Games | | Tackles | | | | Interceptions | | | | Fumbles | | | |
| Year | Team | GP | GS | Comb | Solo | Ast | Sck | Int | Yds | TD | Lng | FF | FR | Yds | TD |
|---|---|---|---|---|---|---|---|---|---|---|---|---|---|---|---|
| 1995 | DET | 1 | 0 | 2 | 2 | 0 | 0.0 | 0 | 0 | 0 | 0 | 0 | 0 | 0 | 0 |
| 1997 | DET | 1 | 1 | **4** | **3** | **1** | 0.0 | 0 | 0 | 0 | 0 | 0 | 0 | 0 | 0 |
| | | 2 | 1 | 6 | 5 | 1 | 0.0 | 0 | 0 | 0 | 0 | 0 | 0 | 0 | 0 |

== Coaching career ==
After leaving the NFL, Wells returned home to St. Louis where he now coaches the defensive line at Missouri Baptist University, .

Previously he coached at the High School level at MICDS, as well as Parkway North High School.
