= Hillsboro R-3 School District =

School district in Missouri, U.S.

Hillsboro R-3 School District is headquartered in Hillsboro, Missouri in Greater St. Louis area. The district encompasses Hillsboro and some unincorporated areas, as well as a small section of DeSoto.

== History ==
In June 2014, the school board hired Leigh Ann Cornman, the wife of superintendent Aaron Cornman, as an instructional coach, with a 5–1 vote. Superintendent Cornman was not part of the hiring committee. There were accusations that superintendent Cornman had influenced the relaxation of hiring policies to help his wife secure the position; though he denied these allegations.

In September 2015, the high school saw a large number of protests from parents and students regarding the right of a pre-operation transgender student, Lila Perry, to use the girls' locker room and restrooms.

== Schools ==
The district schools are located in a single area, divided into two halves by Business Highway 21. The west campus contains the primary school and high school, while the east campus is home to the elementary school, intermediate south, intermediate north, junior high school, learning center, and data center.

- Hillsboro High School
- Hillsboro Junior High School
- Hillsboro Intermediate School
- Hillsboro Elementary School
- Hillsboro Primary School
- Hillsboro Alternative Program/Hillsboro Learning Center
