= Dunklin R-V School District =

School district in Missouri, U.S.

Address
- 497 Joachim Avenue Herculaneum, Missouri, 63048; United States

District information
- Type: Public
- Grades: PreK–12
- Superintendent: Dr. Clint Freeman
- Schools: 4
- Budget: $20,299,000 (2019-20)
- NCES District ID: 2914250

Students and staff
- Students: 1,574 (2021-22)
- Teachers: 122.6 FTE
- Staff: 55.9 FTE
- Student–teacher ratio: 12.84
- Athletic conference: Jefferson County Athletic Association
- District mascot: Blackcat
- Colors: Black and Red

Other information
- Website: www.dunklin.k12.mo.us

Dunklin R-V School District is a public school district headquartered in Herculaneum, Missouri in Greater St. Louis. The district serves several communities in Jefferson County, Missouri, including Herculaneum, Horine, Pevely, and the southwestern portion of the Barnhart area.

== Schools ==
=== Pre-K ===
- Taylor Early Childhood Center

=== Elementary schools ===
- Pevely Elementary

=== Middle schools ===
- Senn-Thomas Middle School(home of Jeffy Milton)

=== High schools ===
- Herculaneum High School
