= Thomas C. Fletcher House =

Historic house in Missouri, United States

- U.S. National Register of Historic Places
- Thomas C. Fletcher House in 2026

- Location within Missouri Location within the United States
- Location: Elm between 1st and 2nd Sts., Hillsboro, Missouri
- Coordinates: 38°13′55″N 90°34′2″W
- Area: less than one acre
- Built: c. 1850
- NRHP reference No.: 74001076
- Added to NRHP: November 19, 1974

Thomas C. Fletcher House is a historic home located at Hillsboro, Jefferson County, Missouri. It was built about 1850, and is a two-story, log dwelling with later frame additions. It sits on a limestone and concrete block foundation. It was the home of Thomas C. Fletcher, Missouri's first Republican governor and the first native-born Missourian elected governor.

It was listed on the National Register of Historic Places in 1974.
