= Gustave Greystone-Meissner House =

Historic house in Missouri, United States

- U.S. National Register of Historic Places
- U.S. Historic district
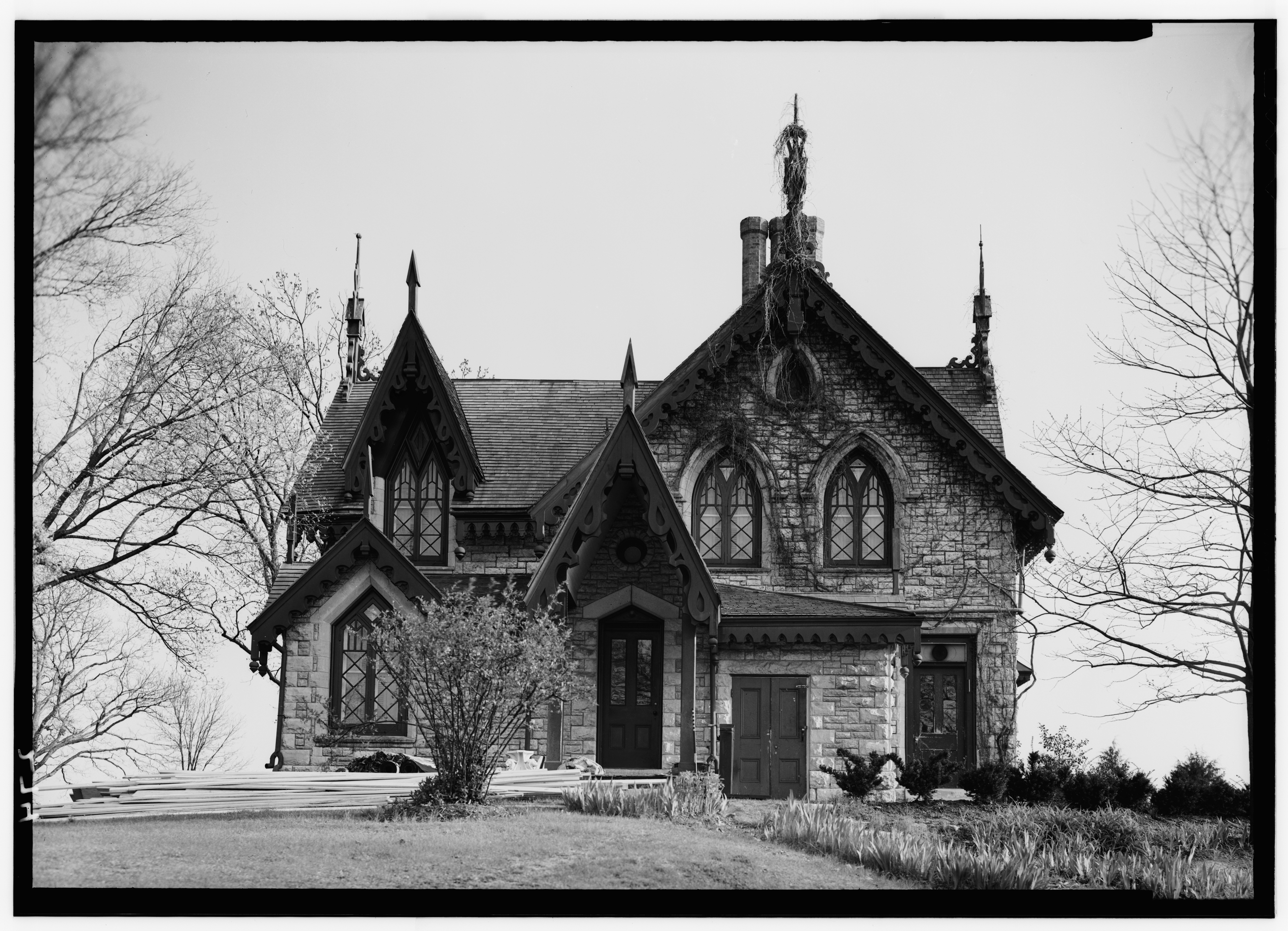
- Gustave Greystone-Meissner House in 1940

- Location within Missouri Location within the United States
- Nearest city: Northeast of Pevely off U.S. Route 61, Pevely, Missouri
- Coordinates: 38°18′13″N 90°22′48″W
- Area: 189 acres (76 ha)
- Built: c. 1845, 1875
- Built by: Williams, Ephraim
- Architect: Hertnel, J.H.
- Architectural style: Gothic Revival
- NRHP reference No.: 74001078
- Added to NRHP: December 31, 1974

Gustave Greystone-Meissner House, also known as Greystone and Evergreen Hill, is a historic home and national historic district located near Pevely, Jefferson County, Missouri. Greystone was built about 1845, and is a two-story, asymmetrical plan, Gothic Revival style frame dwelling. It sits on a limestone block foundation and measures 48 feet, 1 1/2 inches, wide and 39 feet, 1 inch deep. It has a steeply pitched gable roof with dormers and features Carpenter Gothic wood cut-work, finials and drops. Also on the property is the contributing Gustave Meissner House. It was built in 1875, and is 1 1/2-story, L-shaped, frame dwelling with a steeply pitched cross-gable roof.

It was listed on the National Register of Historic Places in 1974.
