= Windsor Harbor Road Bridge =

- U.S. National Register of Historic Places

- Location within Missouri Location within the United States
- Location: Windsor Harbor Road at Rock Creek, Kimmswick, Missouri
- Coordinates: 38°21′50″N 90°21′44″W
- Area: less than one acre
- Built: 1874-1875
- Built by: Keystone Bridge Company
- NRHP reference No.: 83001024
- Added to NRHP: September 8, 1983

Windsor Harbor Road Bridge is a historic Pratt through truss bridge located at Kimmswick, Jefferson County, Missouri. It was built in 1874-1875 by the Keystone Bridge Company; the bridge was dismantled and re-erected at its present site in 1930. It measures 20.3 feet (6.2 m) wide and the span is 123.3 feet (37.6 m).

It was listed on the National Register of Historic Places in 1983.

A sign outside the bridge states:

WINDSOR HARBOR ROAD BRIDGE
Carondelet, Missouri, 1874-1928
Moved to this site 1930
The County Commission of Jefferson County, Missouri, transferred ownership of this bridge to the Kimmswick Historical Society following its placement on the National Register of Historic Places.

Since the construction of the adjacent modern bridge, this historic bridge has been closed to all but pedestrian and non-motorized traffic.

== See also ==
- List of bridges documented by the Historic American Engineering Record in Missouri
