= NRATV =

Online video website of the National Rifle Association of America

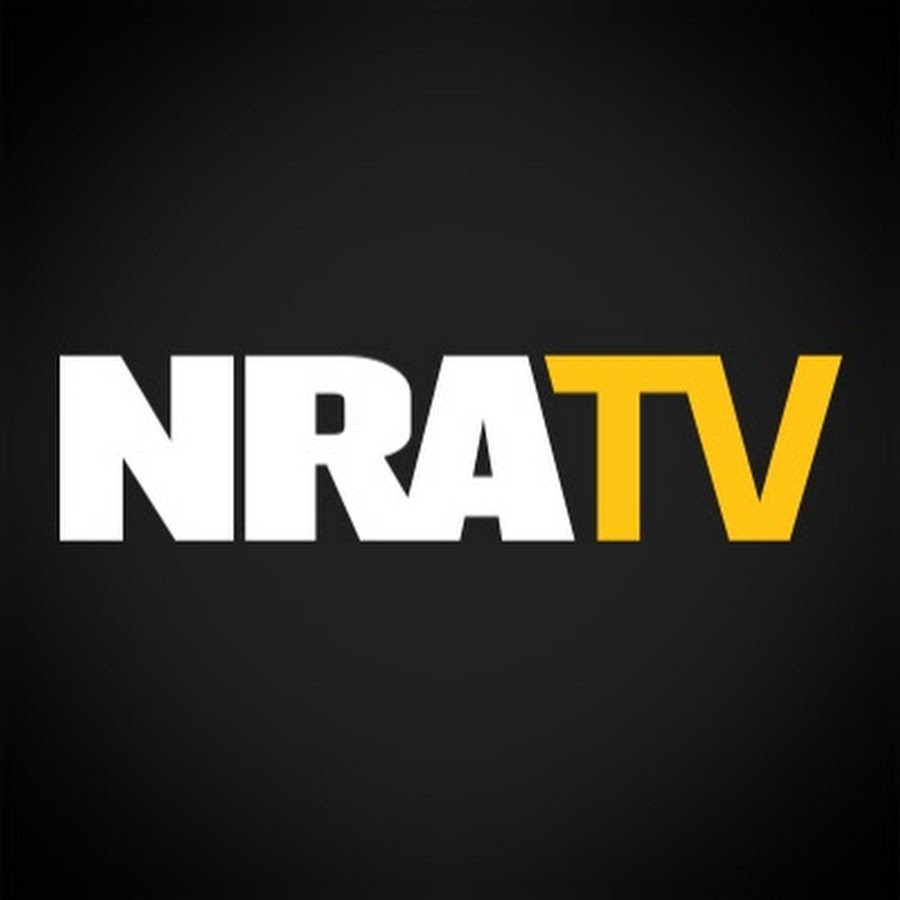
- Country: United States

History
- Launched: 2016
- Closed: June 25, 2019

NRATV (National Rifle Association Television) was the online video channel of the National Rifle Association of America. It was established as an offshoot of NRA News in 2016 and ceased production in 2019 and went offline.

== History ==
In 2004, the National Rifle Association (NRA) began offering NRA News, video content available via smartphone applications, web browsers, and streaming devices, billed as "the most comprehensive video coverage of Second Amendment issues, events and culture anywhere in the world." Content categories included commentary, investigative, lifestyle, profiles, campaigns, and history. In 2016, NRA News was expanded and rebranded as NRATV. Billed as the "voice of the NRA," NRATV is "a central part" of the NRA's messaging, according to The New York Times. The slogan of NRATV is "America's Most Patriotic Team on a Mission to Take Back The Truth."

NRA News and NRATV were created and operated by Ackerman McQueen, an Oklahoma City-based advertising agency. Until 2019, Ackerman McQueen was the National Rifle Association's largest vendor, and the NRA was Ackerman McQueen's largest client. The approach to advertising of the Ackerman McQueen agency is a "philosophy of branded news. Start with the people who matter most, don't be afraid of small audiences, and don't be afraid of owning your narrative. You can do that through advertising but you could also do it as technology progressed in so many ways," according to Ackerman McQueen's chief executive officer Revan McQueen in a 2019 interview. "Every brand must be its own media company," according to the Ackerman McQueen website.

The primary sponsors of NRATV were manufacturers of guns and ammunition, such as O.F. Mossberg & Sons, Smith & Wesson, SIG Sauer, Kimber Manufacturing, and Sturm, Ruger & Co.

In the aftermath of the February 14, 2018 Parkland high school shooting, activists created the hashtags #stopNRAmazon and #DumpNRATV asking Amazon to discontinue streaming programs from NRATV, an initiative supported by celebrities like Alyssa Milano, Denis O’Hare, Evan Handler, Ben Gleib, Joshua Malina, Warren Leight, Genevieve Angelson, Joe Scarborough, Mika Brzezinski, and Misha Collins. Other companies offering NRATV programs as part of their streaming services became the target of a similar campaign launched by Moms Demand Action for Gun Sense and Everytown for Gun Safety.

In late November 2018, NRATV laid off several staff members following a $55 million decrease in revenue at the NRA.

In 2010, Tyler Schropp came to the NRA from Ackerman McQueen and became development director at the NRA. Between 2010 and 2019, the NRA paid $18 million to a production company for the NRATV hunting series Under Wild Skies. Schropp had an ownership position in the production company until at least 2017. As a tax-exempt organization, federal regulation restrict transactions that benefit key executives.

=== NRA v. Ackerman McQueen ===
On April 12, 2019, the NRA sued Ackerman McQueen for over-billing and lack of transparency. The suit alleged that Ackerman had denied the NRA access to basic business records in support of Ackerman's billing to the NRA, a lack of transparency that "threatens to imminently and irreparably harm" the NRA's nonprofit status. Ackerman said the suit was "inaccurate" and "frivolous."

NRATV's editorial scope was a major issue in the lawsuit. Some NRA board members, including Marion Hammer, questioned the value of NRATV to the NRA. According to the NRA in the complaint, "certain NRA stakeholders were also concerned that NRATV’s messaging — on topics far afield of the Second Amendment — deviated from the NRA’s core mission and values." NRATV aired segments on immigration and gender identity, warned of possible race wars, and called for a protest march on the FBI, positions never taken by the NRA.

Among the issues in the lawsuit was the NRA's request for details of Ackerman McQueen's $1 million contract with NRA president Oliver North to host NRATV programming. Ackerman McQueen declined to provide the NRA with the full contract, and North through counsel declined to provide the NRA with the contract without Ackerman McQueen consent. The office of NRA president is unpaid. "Oliver North is employed by Ackerman McQueen, a vendor of the NRA. And it is clear that his loyalty is to Ackerman McQueen," according to NRA board member Marion Hammer. On April 27, 2019, North announced he would not serve a second term.

In June 2019, the NRA's Chief Executive Wayne LaPierre announced that the NRA would halt the production of content at NRATV, a move seen as related to the power struggle in the NRA.
