= Arnold, Missouri =

- City
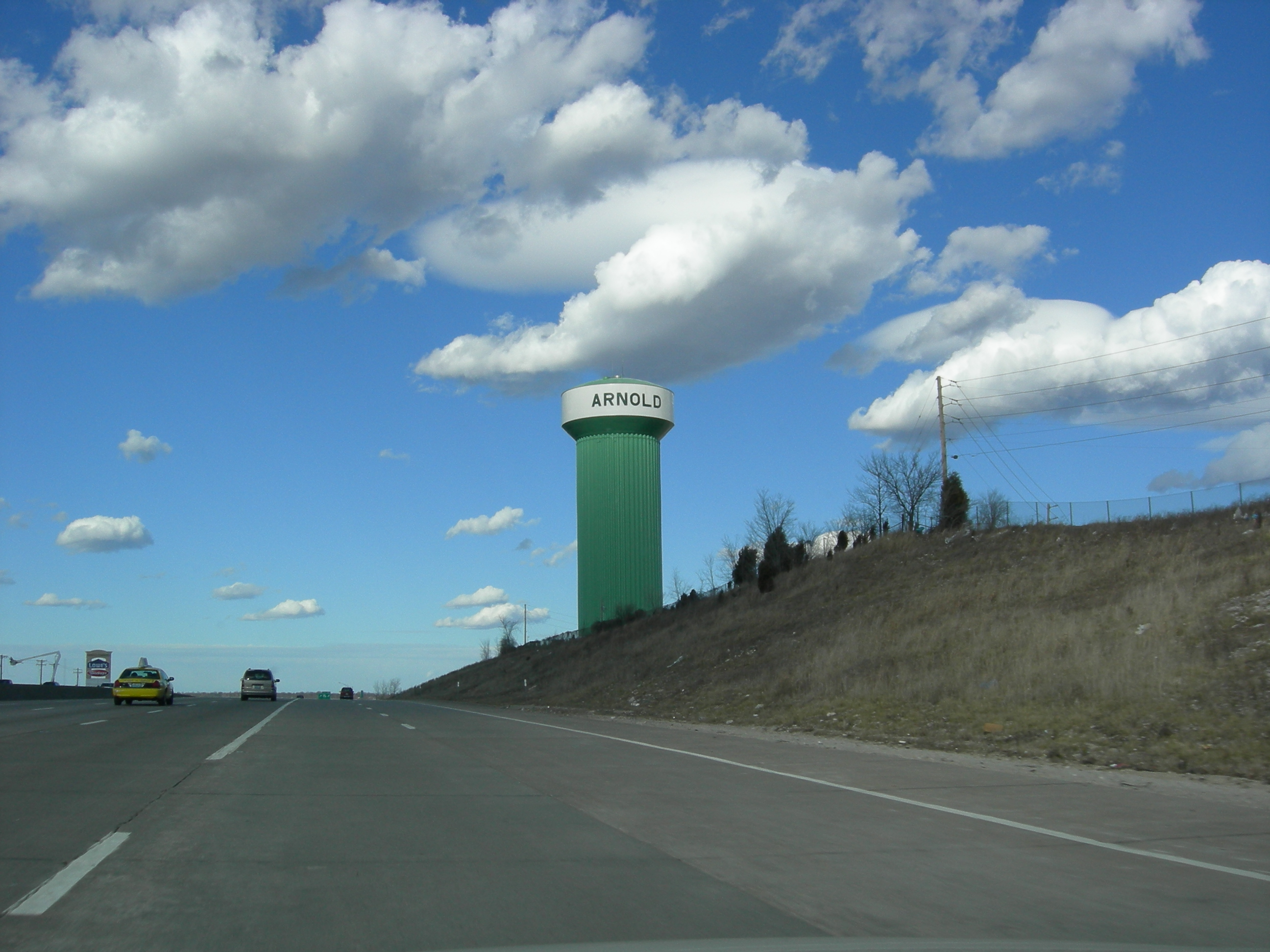
- Arnold Water Tower from I-55 North (color is sky blue since Nov 2015)
- Interactive map of Arnold, Missouri
- Coordinates: 38°25′47″N 90°22′24″W
- Country: United States
- State: Missouri
- County: Jefferson

Government
  - Type: Mayor-Administrator-Council
  - Mayor: William Moritz
  - Administrator: Anthony Traxler

Area
  - Total: 11.53 sq mi (29.86 km^{2})
  - Land: 11.53 sq mi (29.85 km^{2})
  - Water: 0.0039 sq mi (0.01 km^{2})
- Elevation: 522 ft (159 m)

Population (2020)
  - Total: 20,858
  - Density: 1,809.9/sq mi (698.79/km^{2})
- Time zone: UTC-6 (Central (CST))
  - Summer (DST): UTC-5 (CDT)
- ZIP code: 63010
- Area code: 636
- FIPS code: 29-01972
- GNIS ID: 2393991
- Website: arnoldmo.org

Arnold is a city in northeastern Jefferson County, Missouri, situated near the confluence of the Meramec and Mississippi rivers. A suburb of St. Louis, the city lies within the Greater St. Louis metropolitan statistical area. The population was 20,858 at the 2020 United States census, which makes it the most populous community in the county.

== History ==
The Osage peoples were the first people that lived in what today is Arnold, many artifacts have been found in the area that show there was an ancient Osage village near where the Meramec River meets the Mississippi River. In the area where 2 salt licks used to be, human bones have been found, along with pottery shards and many other artifacts. The first European settler in Arnold, was John Hildebrand an immigrant from Germany, that lived in Monongahela County, Pennsylvania. He was the first white settler in the area that is today Jefferson county, he established a settlement near saline creek, with a fort for protection. In 1776 French Canadian settler Jean Baptiste Gamache, who operated a ferry boat across the Meramec River was granted 1050 arpents of land by King Charles III of Spain. This ferry was on the King's Trace or El Camino Real, from St. Louis to Ste. Genevieve, Missouri.[1] [2]

=== Eminent domain ===
Arnold was a focal point over the eminent domain issue in Missouri. In January 2004, the City of Arnold announced that THF Realty had approached them regarding developing a section of Arnold known as the Triangle, an area bordered by Route 141, Interstate 55 and Church Road in the city limits. The city voted in favor of the Triangle Development project proceeding on September 16, 2005.

According to an agreement with THF, Arnold would acquire the properties in the triangle and would be reimbursed its costs by THF. Arnold offered the property owners a buy-out, and most accepted. Some businesses were promised relocation either in the new development or elsewhere in the city. Others were not given this option. Some refused the offer, and the city moved to condemn the dissenting properties. One such hold out was Homer R. Tourkakis, the owner of a dental practice on the corner of the triangle formed by Route 141 and Interstate 55.

Tourkakis claims that THF never made a fair-market offer. THF claims they offered to rebuild his practice elsewhere and purchase his property for $600,000. Tourkakis's property was declared blighted, and Arnold sought to seize it under eminent domain. Tourkakis fought these proceedings in the Jefferson County courts. Arnold and THF argued that although incorporated cities are not explicitly granted the use of eminent domain does not imply they are denied it. The judge ruled that because Arnold is a third-class city, under Missouri law, it cannot use eminent domain to seize properties. In appeal to the Missouri Supreme Court, the decision was reversed, ruling that through the TIF act and the City of Arnold being an incorporated municipality, had the right to use eminent domain.

=== Red light cameras ===
In 2005, Arnold became the first city in Missouri to install red light cameras. A 2009 lawsuit against the cameras was dismissed on procedural grounds. In 2013 the Missouri Court of Appeals Eastern District ruled the Arnold red-light camera ordinance to be unconstitutional.

=== Notable events ===
On October 24, 1988 Republican vice-presidential candidate Dan Quayle addressed the students at Fox High School, listening to questions and discussing the fight on drugs.

On July 17, 1993 President Bill Clinton with several members of his cabinet held a "flood summit" at Fox High School during the Great Flood of 1993. During the summit, Clinton promised the governors of flood-damaged states that his administration would not abandon them once the water recedes.

On April 29, 2009, President Barack Obama held a town hall meeting commemorating his 100th day in office at Fox High School in Arnold. Several members of the presidents cabinet and staff attended the event including senior White House advisers Valerie Jarrett and David Axelrod and National Security Adviser James L. Jones.

=== Meramec River flooding ===
The Meramec River crested at a record level of 47.26 feet on December 31, 2015, after a weekend of heavy rain, affecting over 300 homes and breaking the previous record crest from 1993. The floodwaters closed Interstate 55 at the Meramec just north of Arnold.

Flooding struck again in 2017 after heavy rains, with the Meramec cresting at 45.62 feet on May 3. Only the southbound lanes of I-55 were closed by floodwater. Approximately 20 homes were affected.

== Geography ==
According to the United States Census Bureau, the city has a total area of 11.94 square miles (30.92 km^{2}), of which 11.58 square miles (29.99 km^{2}) is land and 0.36 square miles (0.93 km^{2}) is water.

The city is located at the confluence of the Meramec and Mississippi rivers, just south of St. Louis County.

== Demographics ==
Historical population
Census	Pop.	Note	%±
1980	19,141		—
1990	18,828		−1.6%
2000	19,965		6.0%
2010	20,808		4.2%
2020	20,858		0.2%
U.S. Decennial Census

=== 2020 census ===
As of the 2020 census, Arnold had a population of 20,858 in 8,460 households and 5,607 families. The median age was 41.4 years; 21.2% of residents were under the age of 18 and 18.4% were 65 years of age or older. For every 100 females there were 95.4 males, and for every 100 females age 18 and over there were 92.7 males age 18 and over.

100.0% of residents lived in urban areas, while 0.0% lived in rural areas.

There were 8,460 households, of which 29.9% had children under the age of 18 living in them. Of all households, 49.1% were married-couple households, 16.9% were households with a male householder and no spouse or partner present, and 26.4% were households with a female householder and no spouse or partner present. About 26.5% of all households were made up of individuals and 13.3% had someone living alone who was 65 years of age or older.

There were 8,847 housing units, of which 4.4% were vacant. The homeowner vacancy rate was 1.1% and the rental vacancy rate was 6.7%.

Racial composition as of the 2020 census
Race	Number	Percent
White	18,678	89.5%
Black or African American	196	0.9%
American Indian and Alaska Native	43	0.2%
Asian	232	1.1%
Native Hawaiian and Other Pacific Islander	13	0.1%
Some other race	169	0.8%
Two or more races	1,527	7.3%
Hispanic or Latino (of any race)	636	3.0%

=== 2016–2020 American Community Survey ===
The foreign born population also saw an increase in Arnold, particularly in its Bosnian community.

The 2016–2020 5-year American Community Survey estimates show that the median household income was $64,678 (with a margin of error of +/- $6,401) and the median family income $76,738 (+/- $8,404). Males had a median income of $47,707 (+/- $5,963) versus $32,198 (+/- $4,524) for females. The median income for those above 16 years old was $38,896 (+/- $2,588). Approximately, 6.5% of families and 8.6% of the population were below the poverty line, including 13.4% of those under the age of 18 and 6.5% of those ages 65 or over.

=== 2010 census ===
As of the census of 2010, there were 20,808 people, 8,090 households, and 5,695 families living in the city. The population density was 1,796.9 inhabitants per square mile (693.8/km^{2}). There were 8,547 housing units at an average density of 738.1 per square mile (285.0/km^{2}). The racial makeup of the city was 96.3% White, 0.6% African American, 0.2% Native American, 0.9% Asian, 0.6% from other races, and 1.4% from two or more races. Hispanic or Latino of any race were 2.2% of the population.

There were 8,090 households, of which 34.1% had children under the age of 18 living with them, 52.3% were married couples living together, 12.9% had a female householder with no husband present, 5.2% had a male householder with no wife present, and 29.6% were non-families. 23.9% of all households were made up of individuals, and 9.7% had someone living alone who was 65 years of age or older. The average household size was 2.55 and the average family size was 3.02.

The median age in the city was 39.2 years. 23.3% of residents were under the age of 18; 8.6% were between the ages of 18 and 24; 26.3% were from 25 to 44; 27.4% were from 45 to 64; and 14.4% were 65 years of age or older. The gender makeup of the city was 48.7% male and 51.3% female.

=== 2000 census ===
As of the census of 2000, there were 19,965 people, 7,550 households, and 5,564 families living in the city. The population density was 1,775.0 inhabitants per square mile (685.3/km^{2}). There were 7,913 housing units at an average density of 703.5 per square mile (271.6/km^{2}). The racial makeup of the city was 97.91% White, 0.30% African American, 0.21% Native American, 0.38% Asian, 0.02% Pacific Islander, 0.27% from other races, and 0.92% from two or more races. Hispanic or Latino of any race were 1.04% of the population.

There were 7,550 households, out of which 34.3% had children under the age of 18 living with them, 58.2% were married couples living together, 11.1% had a female householder with no husband present, and 26.3% were non-families. 22.0% of all households were made up of individuals, and 7.7% had someone living alone who was 65 years of age or older. The average household size was 2.61 and the average family size was 3.05.

In the city, the population was spread out, with 25.5% under the age of 18, 8.4% from 18 to 24, 30.4% from 25 to 44, 23.6% from 45 to 64, and 12.1% who were 65 years of age or older. The median age was 37 years. For every 100 females, there were 94.7 males. For every 100 females age 18 and over, there were 90.3 males.

The median income for a household in the city was $47,188, and the median income for a family was $53,664. Males had a median income of $37,972 versus $27,222 for females. The per capita income for the city was $20,378. About 3.0% of families and 4.4% of the population were below the poverty line, including 6.1% of those under age 18 and 3.6% of those age 65 or over.

== Economy ==
In 2014, Anheuser-Busch InBev's subsidiary Metal Container Corp, made the decision to expand their aluminum can and bottle manufacturing plant in Arnold, making the city home to the largest can manufacturing facility in the country.

Arnold is home to one of two offices of the National Geospatial Intelligence Agency in the St. Louis area employing at least 900 workers.

According to Money Magazine, Arnold was ranked the 12th best and most affordable city to live in the United States in 2008.

== Parks and recreation ==
The Department of Parks and Leisure Services maintains a system of outdoor public parks across the city and operates a recreation center with swimming pools and fitness amenities. Many private entities in Arnold also offer recreational facilities and services, such as the Davidson Family Life Center and various sports fields on church or school property.

=== Arnold City Park ===
Interactive map of Arnold City Park

Arnold City Park is a park in northeastern Arnold located near the historical place of Lakeside. The 68-acre park features a large fishing lake and four pavilions, each with electrical service and a barbecue grill. The park also offers a playground, a paved walking and hiking trail, two multipurpose dirt fields, and equipment for horseshoes, volleyball, and disc golf.

=== Ferd B. Lang Park ===
Interactive map of Ferd B. Lang Park

Ferd B. Lang Park is a 25-acre park in central Arnold. The park has five pavilions with electrical service and barbecue grills. Other amenities include a playground, walking and hiking trails, two multipurpose grass fields, five horseshoe pits, three sand volleyball courts, Arnold Jaycees Skate Park, basketball half-court, dog park, and restrooms.

=== Other amenities ===
The City of Arnold offers a full service Recreational Center that features two levels, including an indoor leisure pool and a seasonal outdoor pool with a concession stand. The upper level has three meeting rooms, a 3-lane walking track overlooking the gym, and a spacious lounge furnished with a sizable seating area, a pool table, air hockey, and foosball. The lower level comprises a weight room, a two-court gym, a fitness center, the indoor pool, locker rooms, and a party room. First Baptist Church of Arnold offers a free NCAA caliber gymnasium, weight rooms, cardio center, arts & craft center, indoor walking track. An orientation is required prior to use.

== Education ==
The Fox C-6 School District operates public schools. Three elementary schools are in the city limits: Fox Elementary School, Rockport Heights Elementary School, and Sherwood Elementary School. Fox Middle School and Fox High School are in Arnold.

The Fox district was originally a K-8 school district, with high school students having a choice of Crystal City High School and Herculaneum High School. The district became K-12 when Fox High School was established in 1955.

Arnold has a public library, a branch of the Jefferson County Library.

The Jefferson College (Missouri) Arnold campus was opened in 2007 to expand educational services to those in northern Jefferson County. The 40,000 square feet (3,700 m2) facility is located at 1687 Missouri State Road behind the Arnold Library and Recreation Center.

== Notable People ==
- Louisa Frederici born in Arnold and married Buffalo Bill Cody
- Frank J. Grass, General and Chief of National Guard Bureau
- Dana Loesch, spokesperson for the National Rifle Association of America
- Kenny Wallace, former NASCAR driver
- Rusty Wallace, former NASCAR champion
- Mike Wells, former NFL defensive tackle, 1994-2001
- Max Palmer, actor 1952-1954 and professional wrestler known in the ring as Paul Bunyan 1955-1960. Was the 2nd tallest professional wrestler in history standing 8'2" tall and weighing 499 pounds.

== Locations ==
- Wickes, a former stop on the Missouri Pacific Railroad
- Women Against Registry, a national organization dedicated to abolishing the public Sex Offender Registry.
