= Kimmswick Historic District =

Historic district in Missouri, United States

- U.S. National Register of Historic Places
- U.S. Historic district
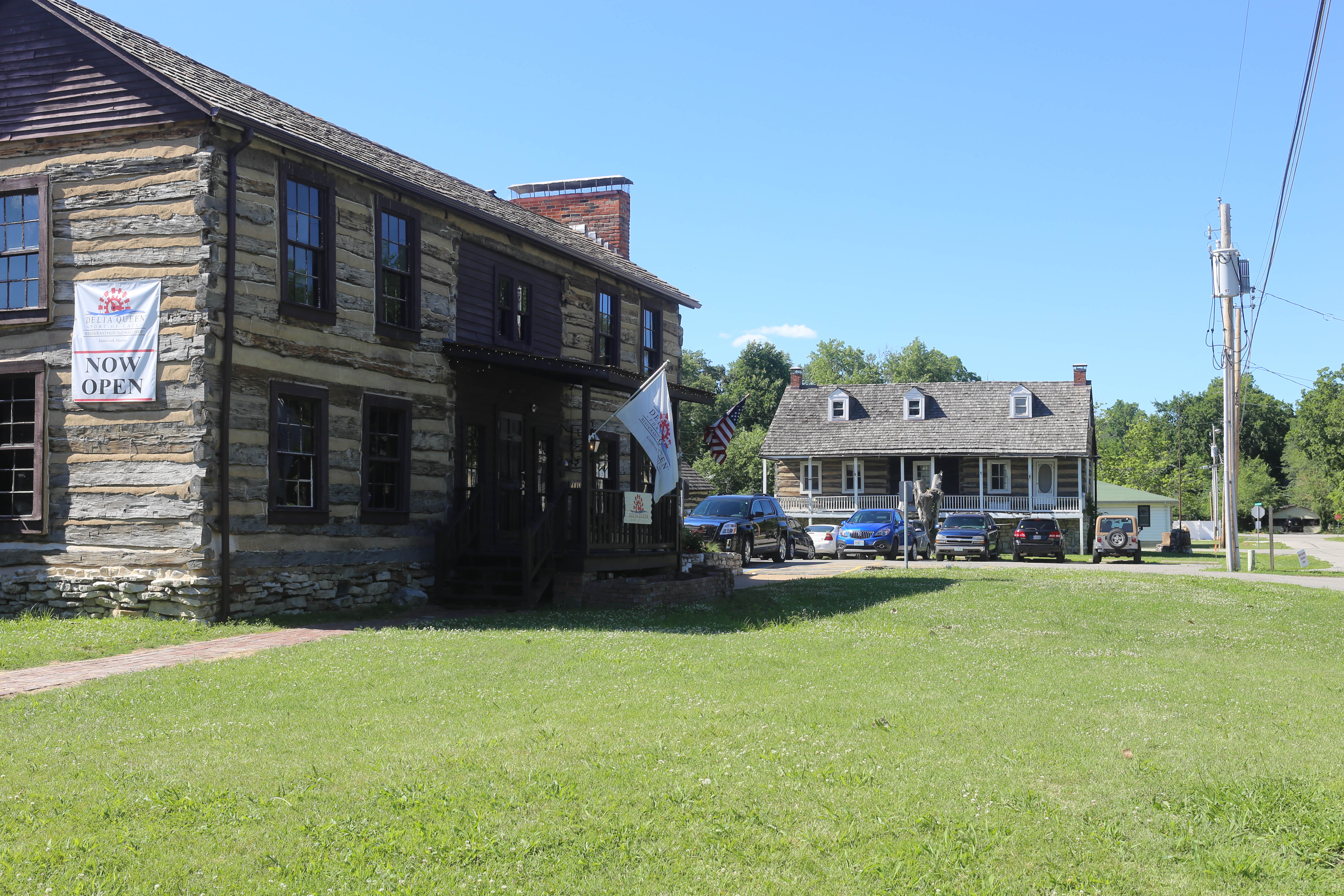

- Location within Missouri Location within the United States
- Location: Roughly bounded by Front St., Fourth St., Mill St., Elm St. and Oak St., Kimmswick, Missouri
- Coordinates: 38°22′00″N 90°21′51″W
- Area: 9.5 acres (3.8 ha)
- Built: 1859
- Architectural style: Late 19th And Early 20th Century American Movements, Bungalow/craftsman
- NRHP reference No.: 07000752
- Added to NRHP: July 24, 2007

Kimmswick Historic District is a historic national historic district located at Kimmswick, Jefferson County, Missouri. The district encompasses 44 contributing buildings, 1 contributing site, and 1 contributing structure in the central business district and surrounding residential sections of Kimmswick. It developed between about 1859 and 1940 and includes representative examples of Bungalow / American Craftsman style architecture. Notable buildings include the Barbagallo House (c. 1850), Bernard Klein House (c. 1865), Horninghauser House (c. 1865), Franz A Hermann / John O'Heim House and Brewery (c. 1859), Kimmswick Post Office (1914), Martin Meyer Building (c. 1880), The Old Market (c. 1877), Rauschenbach Building (1884), Phillip Meyer Building (c. 1875), Ambrose Ziegler House (c. 1925), and Kimmswick City Hall (c. 1903).

It was listed on the National Register of Historic Places in 2007.
