= Ackerman McQueen =

American advertising firm

- Company type: Advertising and media
- Industry: Print and video advertisements
- Founded: 1939 in Oklahoma City, Oklahoma
- Founders: Ray Ackerman; Marvin McQueen; Lee Allan Smith
- Headquarters: Oklahoma City, Oklahoma, U.S.
- Number of locations: 5 (2015)
- Area served: Worldwide
- Key people: Angus McQueen (CEO); Revan McQueen (Co-CEO); Bill Winkler (CFO)
- Revenue: $37.6 million (2012)
- Number of employees: 230 (2015)
- Website: AM.com/home

Ackerman McQueen, also called "Ack-Mac", is an advertising agency based in Oklahoma City. Founded in 1939, it has expanded to include offices in Alexandria, Virginia; Colorado Springs, Colorado; Dallas, Texas; and Tulsa, Oklahoma. Ackerman McQueen has about 225 employees.

== History ==
Ackerman McQueen was started by Ray Ackerman in 1954. Ackerman bought the shop of George W. Knox's advertising agency, and by the early 1970s, Ackerman "was joined by the father-and-son team of Marvin and Angus McQueen."

In the early 1980s Harlon Carter, a top executive at the National Rifle Association (NRA), decided to hire an outside agency who "knew its way around a firearm" and Ackerman McQueen was picked.

== Clients ==
Ackerman McQueen worked for the NRA from the 1980s through 2019; the relationship was called one of the strongest in the advertising field. The firm is credited with much of the NRA's modern success. Until 2019 most of the firm's efforts were on behalf of the NRA account. Services provided the NRA include "public-relations work, marketing, branding, corporate communications, event planning, Web design, social-media engagement, and digital-content production." Ackerman was involved in developing and marketing NRA Carry Guard, a for-fee program which made available to members a bundle of handgun training with liability insurance coverage for defensive gun use. In 2017, the NRA paid Ackerman $42.6 million, making it the NRA's largest vendor.

In 2016 Ackerman created the online channel NRATV, billed as the "voice of the NRA" but operated by Ackerman. Its primary sponsors were manufacturers of guns and ammunition, such as Mossberg, Smith & Wesson, and SIG Sauer. One of the channel's hosts was Oliver North, the 2018-19 president of the NRA.

In 2019, the NRA sued Ackerman McQueen for overbilling and severed ties with the organization. One issue in the lawsuit was NRATV, with a complaint that the content of NRATV has strayed far beyond the NRA's core mission of gun rights, airing segments on immigration and gender identity, among other things. The channel also warned of possible race wars and called for a protest march on the FBI - positions never taken by the NRA. It was also alleged that NRA CEO Wayne LaPierre had laundered high-value expenses through the agency (including suits and private jets), which were then billed back to the NRA. The dispute was settled on March 3, 2022, a day before court hearings were due to begin. The loss of the NRA account resulted in significant layoffs and the closure of the office in Alexandria, Virginia.

Other clients have included Six Flags amusement parks, some Oklahoma casinos, and the Chickasaw Nation.

== Controversy ==
In July 2020, Tammy Payne, a former employee, sued company CEO Revan McQueen in Oklahoma County District Court accusing the latter of hostile and abusive behavior towards her due to her romantic relationship with his widowed father. The suit was dismissed with prejudice two months later at Payne's request.
