= Stonebrook =

Historic house in Missouri, United States

- U.S. National Register of Historic Places
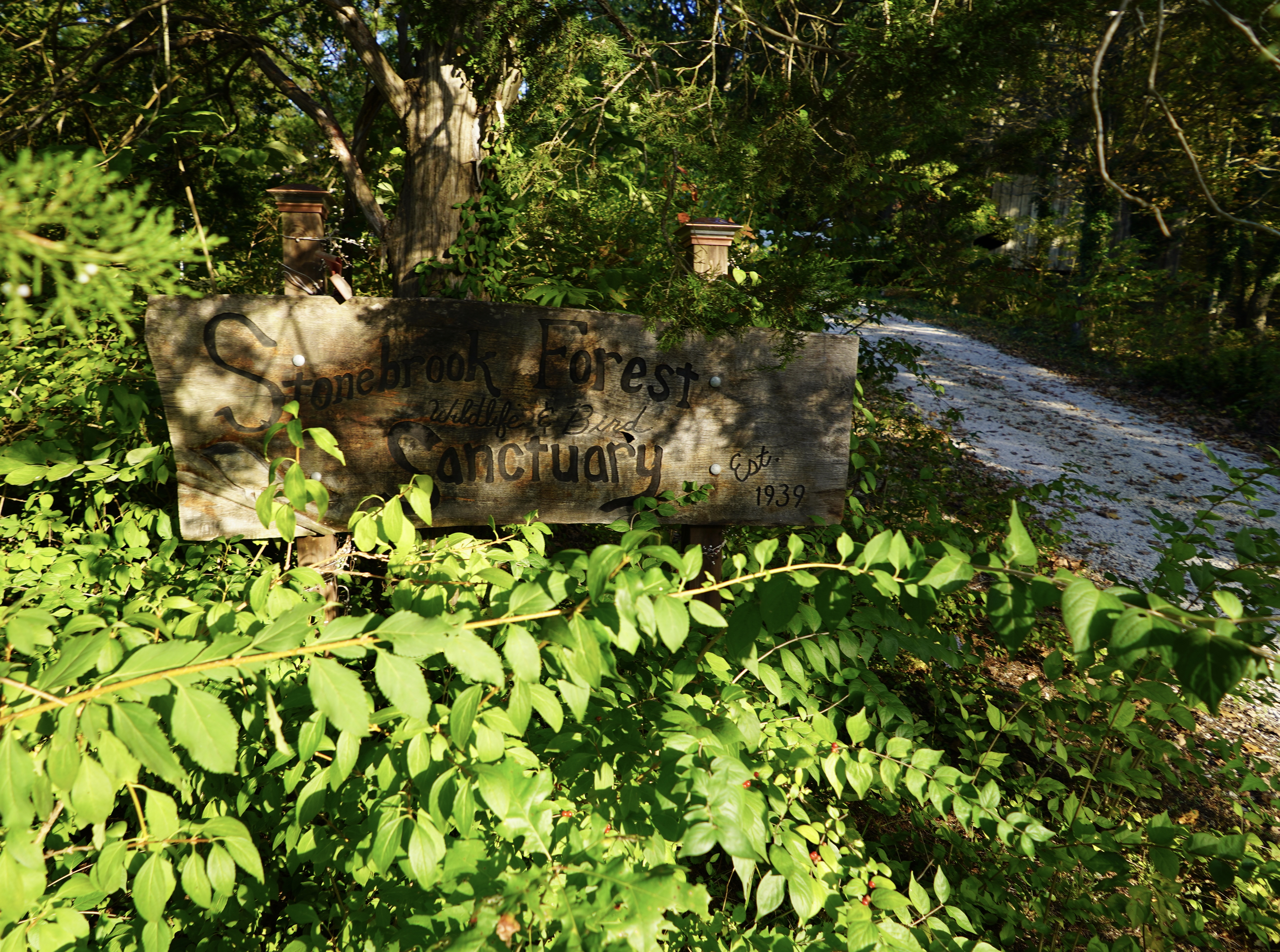
- Stonebrook sign

- Location within Missouri Location within the United States
- Location: 3511 Stonebrook Forest Dr., Antonia, Missouri
- Coordinates: 38°21′38″N 90°27′44″W
- Area: 15.86 acres (6.42 ha)
- Built: 1958-1959
- Architect: Harris Armstrong
- Architectural style: Modern Movement
- NRHP reference No.: 10001130
- Added to NRHP: January 14, 2011

Stonebrook is a historic home located at Antonia, Jefferson County, Missouri. It was built in 1958–1959, and is a two-section, split-level frame house in the Modern Movement style. It sits on a concrete foundation and is sheathed in vertical wooden siding with battens and horizontal weatherboard. The Stonebrook property is a documented pre-glacial Missouri wildflower preserve.

It was listed on the National Register of Historic Places in 2011.
