= Kimmswick, Missouri =

- City
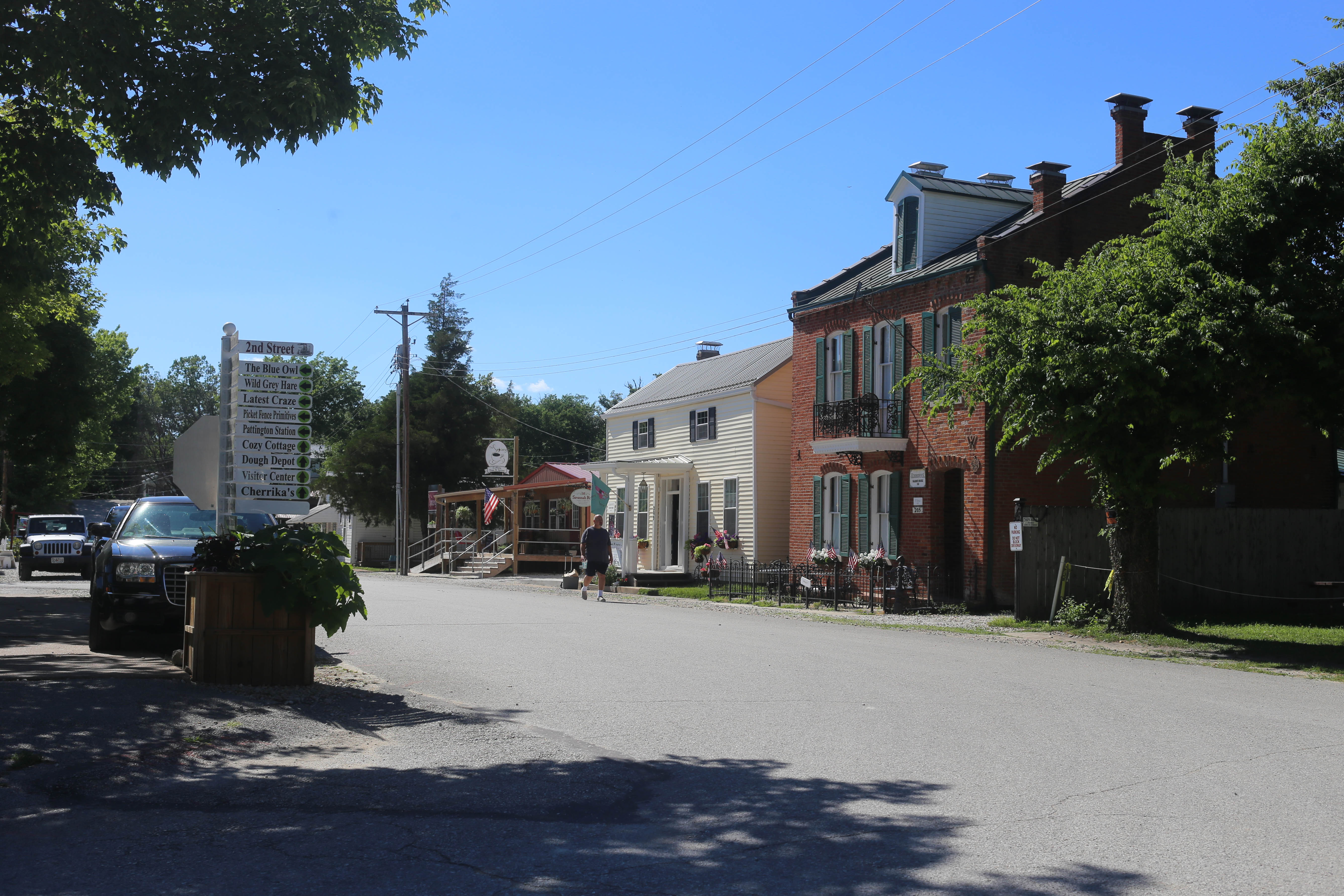
- Market Street Barbagallo House The Old House City Hall

- Location of Kimmswick, Missouri
- Coordinates: 38°21′56″N 90°21′53″W
- Country: United States
- State: Missouri
- County: Jefferson

Area
  - Total: 0.24 sq mi (0.61 km^{2})
  - Land: 0.24 sq mi (0.61 km^{2})
  - Water: 0 sq mi (0.00 km^{2})
- Elevation: 407 ft (124 m)

Population (2020)
  - Total: 133
  - Density: 569.0/sq mi (219.71/km^{2})
- Time zone: UTC-6 (Central (CST))
  - Summer (DST): UTC-5 (CDT)
- ZIP Code: 63053
- Area code: 636
- FIPS code: 29-38684
- GNIS feature ID: 2395533
- Website: cityofkimmswick.org

Kimmswick is a city in Jefferson County, Missouri, United States. As of the 2020 census, Kimmswick had a population of 133.

== Geography ==
Kimmswick is next to the Mississippi River.

According to the United States Census Bureau, the city has a total area of 0.23 square miles (0.60 km^{2}), all land.

Nearby Imperial was once known as West Kimmswick. Today, Kimmswick is an enclave of Imperial.

== History ==
Kimmswick was platted in 1859 by Theodore Kimm, who gave the town his last name. A post office called Kimmswick was established in 1858, and remains open.

The Kimmswick Historic District and Windsor Harbor Road Bridge are listed on the National Register of Historic Places.

== Demographics ==
Historical population
Census	Pop.	Note	%±
1890	182		—
1900	212		16.5%
1910	235		10.8%
1920	141		−40.0%
1930	172		22.0%
1940	172		0.0%
1950	207		20.3%
1960	303		46.4%
1970	268		−11.6%
1980	207		−22.8%
1990	135		−34.8%
2000	94		−30.4%
2010	157		67.0%
2020	133		−15.3%
U.S. Decennial Census

=== 2010 census ===
As of the census of 2010, there were 157 people, 56 households, and 41 families living in the city. The population density was 682.6 inhabitants per square mile (263.6/km^{2}). There were 68 housing units at an average density of 295.7 per square mile (114.2/km^{2}). The racial makeup of the city was 90.4% White, 1.3% African American, 6.4% Asian, and 1.9% from two or more races. Hispanic or Latino of any race were 1.3% of the population.

There were 56 households, of which 39.3% had children under the age of 18 living with them, 57.1% were married couples living together, 16.1% had a female householder with no husband present, and 26.8% were non-families. 23.2% of all households were made up of individuals, and 7.1% had someone living alone who was 65 years of age or older. The average household size was 2.80 and the average family size was 3.34.

The median age in the city was 32.5 years. 26.8% of residents were under the age of 18; 9.5% were between the ages of 18 and 24; 26.1% were from 25 to 44; 28.6% were from 45 to 64; and 8.9% were 65 years of age or older. The gender makeup of the city was 45.9% male and 54.1% female.

=== 2000 census ===
As of the census of 2000, there were 94 people, 35 households, and 24 families living in the city. The population density was 1,186.5 people per square mile (453.7/km^{2}). There were 36 housing units at an average density of 454.4 per square mile (175.4/km^{2}). The racial makeup of the city was 89.36% White, 1.06% African American, and 9.57% from two or more races.

There were 35 households, out of which 22.9% had children under the age of 18 living with them, 54.3% were married couples living together, 17.1% had a female householder with no husband present, and 28.6% were non-families. 25.7% of all households were made up of individuals, and 14.3% had someone living alone who was 65 years of age or older. The average household size was 2.69 and the average family size was 3.24.

In the city the population was spread out, with 21.3% under the age of 18, 10.6% from 18 to 24, 27.7% from 25 to 44, 17.0% from 45 to 64, and 23.4% who were 65 years of age or older. The median age was 40 years. For every 100 females there were 84.3 males. For every 100 females age 18 and over, there were 80.5 males.

The median income for a household in the city was $54,688, and the median income for a family was $66,250. Males had a median income of $44,250 versus $34,375 for females. The per capita income for the city was $23,359. There were 3.6% of families and 7.0% of the population living below the poverty line, including 8.3% of under eighteens and 21.4% of those over 64.

== Apple Butter Festival ==
The Kimmswick Apple Butter Festival is an annual Fall celebration and the city's largest event with typically over 100,000 visitors attending. The streets are lined with 500 – 600 food, drink and craft vendors as well as live entertainment throughout the town including bluegrass, country rock, and dulcimer music. While there is some parking in the ballfields on Highway K as you enter the festival, visitors are encouraged to park at nearby Windsor High School where there will be buses running throughout the day shuttling visitors to-and-from the festival. The festival is scheduled each year at the end of October

== Anheuser House ==
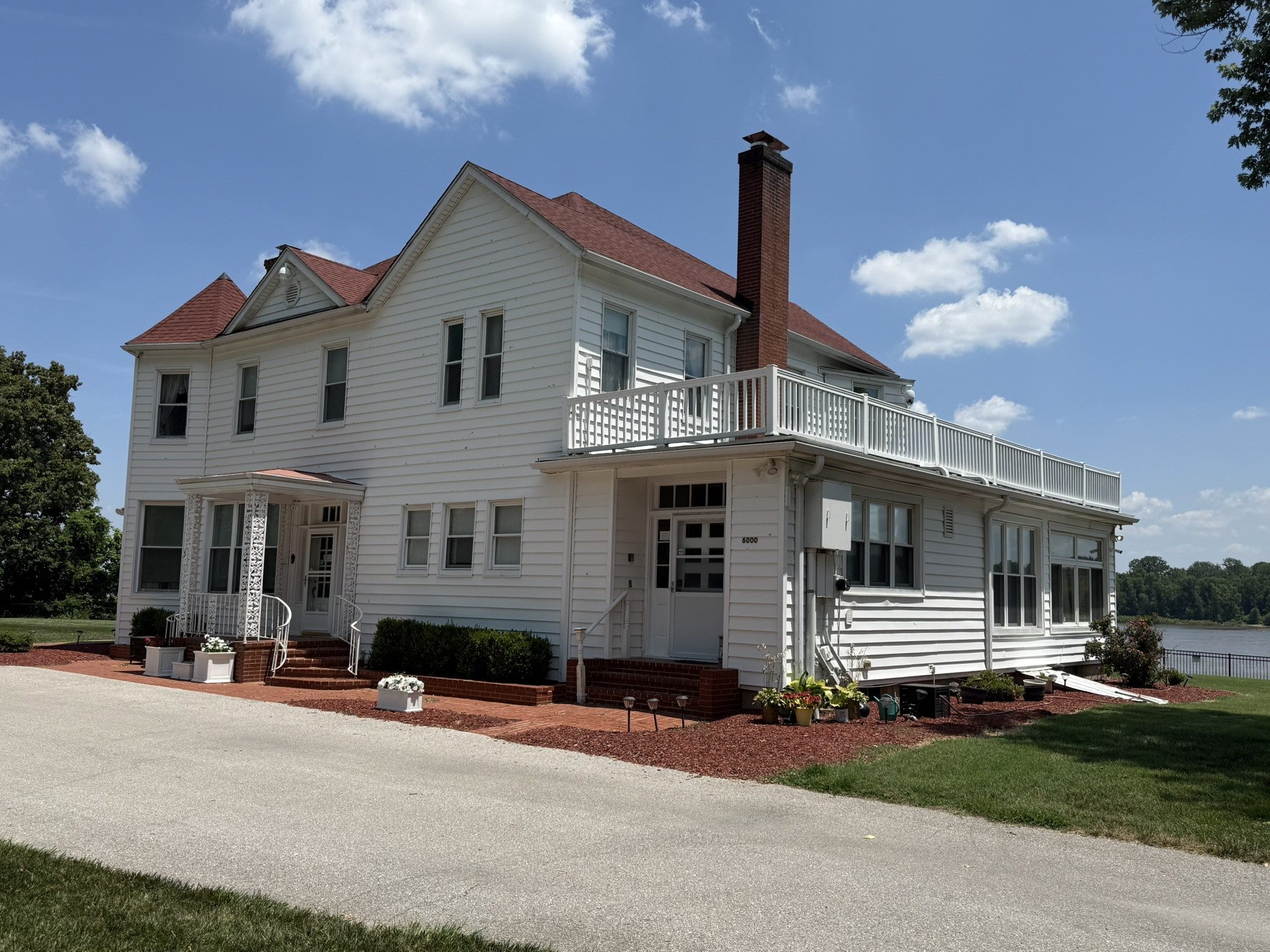
Anheuser Estate. July 5, 2025

Is an estate built in 1867 that overlooks the Mississippi River. The Anheuser family bought the estate in 1916. Fred and Mabel Ruth Anheuser owed it until their deaths in 1984 and 2000 respectively. Fred's great-grandfather, Eberhard Anheuser, established the E. Anheuser Brewing Company, which eventually evolved into the Anheuser-Busch Brewing Company. Mabel-Ruth Anheuser donated the home and grounds to the city of Kimmswick along with $1.5 million for the upkeep of the estate. The estate is available on occasion for tours and also available to rent for special occasions.

== Education ==
Kimmswick is within the Windsor C-1 School District.
