= Pevely, Missouri =

- City
- Pevely in October 2026

- Location of Pevely, Missouri
- Coordinates: 38°17′14″N 90°23′57″W
- Country: United States
- State: Missouri
- County: Jefferson
- Incorporated: 1953

Government
  - Mayor: Steve Markus

Area
  - Total: 4.96 sq mi (12.85 km^{2})
  - Land: 4.91 sq mi (12.72 km^{2})
  - Water: 0.050 sq mi (0.13 km^{2})
- Elevation: 449 ft (137 m)

Population (2020)
  - Total: 6,026
  - Density: 1,227.2/sq mi (473.83/km^{2})
- Time zone: UTC-6 (Central (CST))
  - Summer (DST): UTC-5 (CDT)
- ZIP code: 63070
- Area code: 636
- FIPS code: 29-57278
- GNIS feature ID: 2396196
- Website: www.cityofpevelymo.gov

Pevely is a city in Jefferson County, Missouri, United States, and a suburb of St. Louis about 30 miles (48 km) south of St. Louis. The population was 6,012, at the 2020 United States census.

== History ==
Pevely was platted in 1860. A post office called Pevely has been in operation since 1858.

The Gustave Greystone-Meissner House was listed on the National Register of Historic Places in 1974.

== Geography ==
According to the United States Census Bureau, the city has a total area of 4.69 square miles (12.15 km^{2}), of which 4.54 square miles (11.76 km^{2}) is land and 0.15 square miles (0.39 km^{2}) is water.

== Demographics ==
Historical population
Census	Pop.	Note	%±
1920	167		—
1930	274		64.1%
1940	311		13.5%
1950	416		33.8%
1960	416		0.0%
1970	517		24.3%
1980	2,732		428.4%
1990	2,831		3.6%
2000	3,768		33.1%
2010	5,484		45.5%
2020	6,026		9.9%
U.S. Decennial Census

=== 2020 census ===
As of the 2020 census, Pevely had a population of 6,026. The median age was 35.4 years. 26.3% of residents were under the age of 18 and 12.9% of residents were 65 years of age or older. For every 100 females there were 92.5 males, and for every 100 females age 18 and over there were 88.6 males age 18 and over.

99.5% of residents lived in urban areas, while 0.5% lived in rural areas.

There were 2,354 households in Pevely, of which 36.3% had children under the age of 18 living in them. Of all households, 44.3% were married-couple households, 16.7% were households with a male householder and no spouse or partner present, and 29.1% were households with a female householder and no spouse or partner present. About 24.6% of all households were made up of individuals and 8.4% had someone living alone who was 65 years of age or older.

There were 2,502 housing units, of which 5.9% were vacant. The homeowner vacancy rate was 1.2% and the rental vacancy rate was 9.9%.

Racial composition as of the 2020 census
Race	Number	Percent
White	5,347	88.7%
Black or African American	119	2.0%
American Indian and Alaska Native	22	0.4%
Asian	34	0.6%
Native Hawaiian and Other Pacific Islander	4	0.1%
Some other race	50	0.8%
Two or more races	450	7.5%
Hispanic or Latino (of any race)	145	2.4%

=== 2010 census ===
As of the census of 2010, there were 5,484 people, 2,128 households, and 1,493 families living in the city. The population density was 1,207.9 inhabitants per square mile (466.4/km^{2}). There were 2,318 housing units at an average density of 510.6 per square mile (197.1/km^{2}). The racial makeup of the city was 96.2% White, 1.0% African American, 0.3% Native American, 0.3% Asian, 0.1% from other races, and 2.0% from two or more races. Hispanic or Latino of any race were 1.2% of the population.

There were 2,128 households, of which 41.2% had children under the age of 18 living with them, 46.2% were married couples living together, 17.2% had a female householder with no husband present, 6.8% had a male householder with no wife present, and 29.8% were non-families. 23.6% of all households were made up of individuals, and 6.3% had someone living alone who was 65 years of age or older. The average household size was 2.57 and the average family size was 3.00.

The median age in the city was 31.5 years. 28.6% of residents were under the age of 18; 10% were between the ages of 18 and 24; 28.8% were from 25 to 44; 23.8% were from 45 to 64; and 8.8% were 65 years of age or older. The gender makeup of the city was 48.2% male and 51.8% female.

=== 2000 census ===
As of the census of 2000, there were 3,768 people, 1,411 households, and 1,008 families living in the city. The population density was 1,133.7 inhabitants per square mile (437.7/km^{2}). There were 1,482 housing units at an average density of 445.9 per square mile (172.2/km^{2}). The racial makeup of the city was 95.89% White, 1.59% African American, 0.37% Native American, 0.45% Asian, 0.29% from other races, and 1.41% from two or more races. Hispanic or Latino of any race were 0.93% of the population.

There were 1,411 households, out of which 40.5% had children under the age of 18 living with them, 48.1% were married couples living together, 16.7% had a female householder with no husband present, and 28.5% were non-families. 23.4% of all households were made up of individuals, and 8.6% had someone living alone who was 65 years of age or older. The average household size was 2.67 and the average family size was 3.12.

In the city the population was spread out, with 30.1% under the age of 18, 10.5% from 18 to 24, 30.4% from 25 to 44, 20.3% from 45 to 64, and 8.6% who were 65 years of age or older. The median age was 31 years. For every 100 females, there were 93.3 males. For every 100 females age 18 and over, there were 90.7 males.

The median income for a household in the city was $34,916, and the median income for a family was $37,288. The per capita income for the city was $14,403. About 19.7% of families and 19.6% of the population were below the poverty line, including 25.7% of those under age 18 and 19.5% of those age 65 or over.

Pevely Homecoming Festival August 25, 2007

== Education ==
Dunklin R-V School District serves Pevely.

== Attractions ==
I-55 Raceway is a high-banked 1/3 mile dirt oval racetrack. It hosts World of Outlaws Sprint Car Series races (including the Ironman 55) and a round of the DIRTcar Summer Nationals, as well as weekly racing on Saturday nights.
