= Hillsboro High School (Missouri) =

American high school in Missouri

Location
- 123 Leon Hall Parkway; Hillsboro, Missouri 63050; United States; 38°14′28″N 90°34′13″W

Information
- Type: Public high school
- Motto: Home of the Hawks
- School district: Hillsboro R-3 School District
- Principal: Billy Reese
- Teaching staff: 67.85 (on an FTE basis)
- Grades: 9–12
- Enrollment: 1,124 (2023–24)
- Student to teacher ratio: 16.57
- Colors: Blue and white
- Athletics conference: MSHAA
- Sports: Football, Golf, Track, Cross Country, Volleyball, Soccer, Pom Pon, Wrestling, Baseball, Basketball, Softball
- Nickname: Hawks
- Rival: Festus High School, DeSoto High School, Grandview High School
- Website: hsdr3.org/o/hillsboro-high-school

Hillsboro High School is a public high school located in Hillsboro, Missouri. It is the only high school in the Hillsboro R-3 School District.

== Student body ==
Hillsboro High school has approximately 1,140 students of which only 3% are from ethnic minorities. 25% of the student body is economically disadvantaged and the school scored 80% proficient in reading and 47% in math.

== Controversy ==
In September 2015, the high school experienced a large number of parents and students protesting against the right of a pre-operation transgender student, Lila Perry, to use the girls' locker room and restrooms. Students of the High school started a walkout in support of banning Lily Perry from the girls' bathroom and locker room. Perry was offered a separate gender-neutral bathroom in response to her request, but refused. Many of the students that participated in the walkout did so simply to leave school.

== Notable alumni ==
- Austin Romaine, college football linebacker for the Kansas State Wildcats

== See also ==
- List of high schools in Missouri
