= Antonia, Missouri =

Unincorporated community in Missouri, U.S.

Coordinates: 38°21′45″N 90°27′56″W

Antonia in October 2026

Antonia is an unincorporated community in Jefferson County, in the U.S. state of Missouri.

== History ==
A post office called Antonia was established in 1874, and remained in operation until 1905. Antonia most likely derives its name from the first name of Anton Yeager, the original owner of the site.

In 1925, Antonia had 50 inhabitants.

Stonebrook was listed on the National Register of Historic Places in 2011.
