= Hillsboro, Missouri =

- City
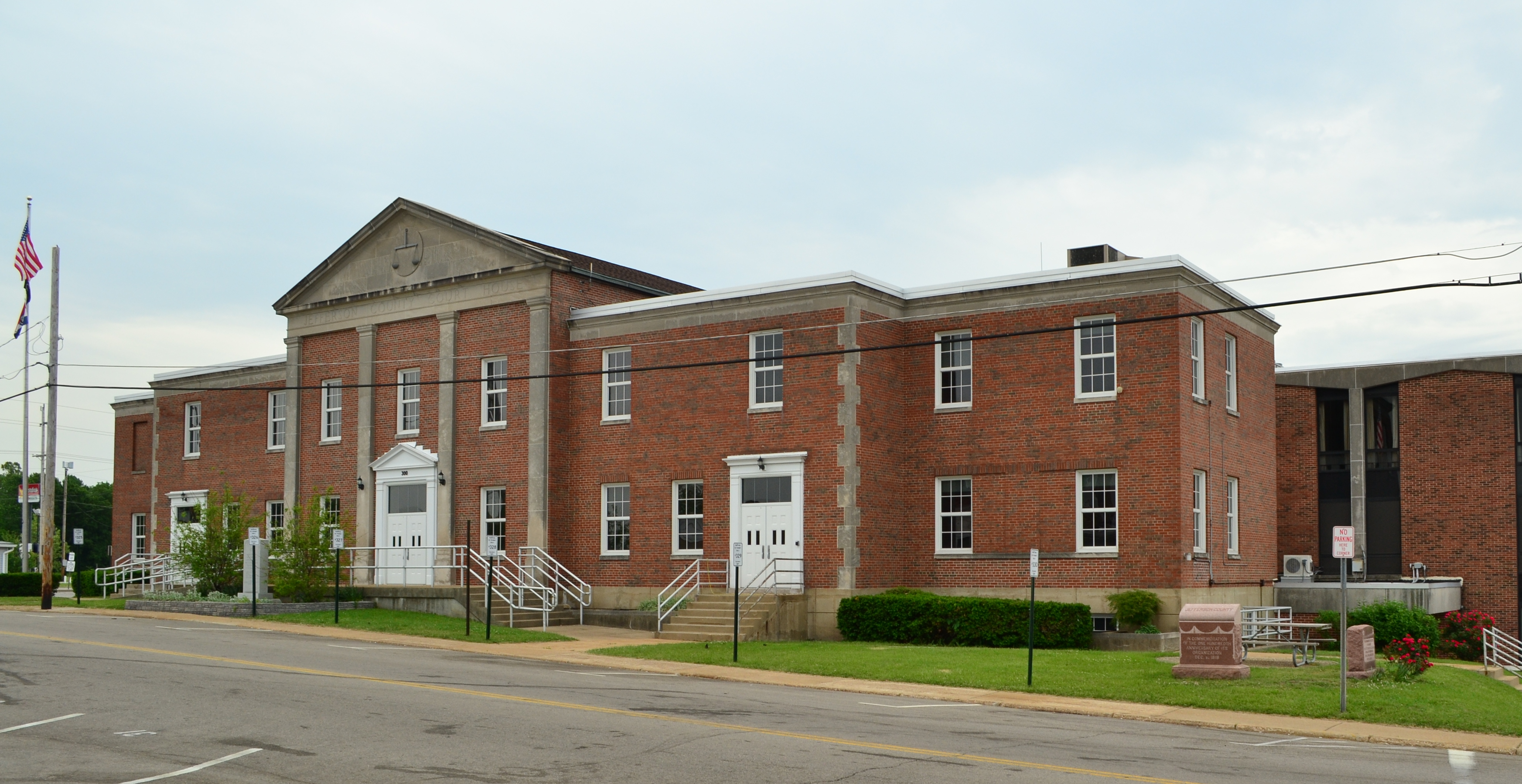
- Jefferson County Courthouse in Hillsboro
- Nickname: The Boro
- Location of Hillsboro, Missouri
- Coordinates: 38°13′59″N 90°34′02″W
- Country: United States
- State: Missouri
- County: Jefferson
- Incorporated: 1839

Government
  - Mayor: Buddy Russell

Area
  - Total: 3.84 sq mi (9.95 km^{2})
  - Land: 3.84 sq mi (9.95 km^{2})
  - Water: 0 sq mi (0.00 km^{2})
- Elevation: 771 ft (235 m)

Population (2020)
  - Total: 3,473
  - Density: 903.9/sq mi (348.98/km^{2})
- Time zone: UTC-6 (Central (CST))
  - Summer (DST): UTC-5 (CDT)
- ZIP code: 63050
- Area code: 636
- FIPS code: 29-32248
- GNIS feature ID: 2394388
- Website: hillsboromo.gov

Hillsboro is a city in and the county seat of Jefferson County, Missouri, United States. The population was 3,473 at the 2020 census, up from 2,821 in 2010.

== History ==
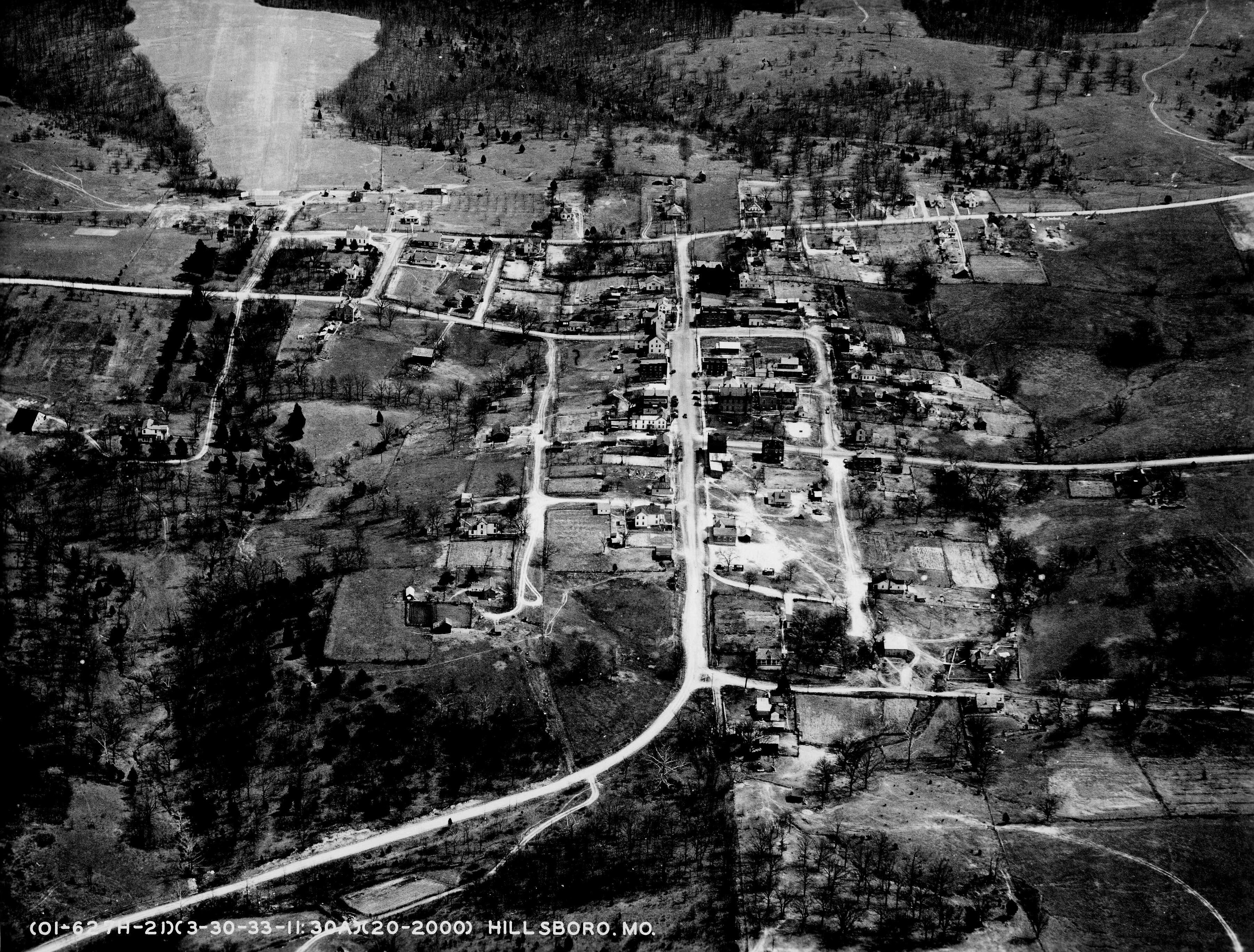
Hillsboro in 1933

Hillsboro was originally called Monticello, and under the latter name was platted in 1839, and named after Monticello, home of President Thomas Jefferson. The name Monticello was afterwards changed because the U.S. postal authorities refused to accept that name, there being another post office in the state with a similar name. The present name Hillsboro is the English equivalent of the Italian name Monticello. A post office has been in operation at Hillsboro since 1838.

The Thomas C. Fletcher House and Sandy Creek Covered Bridge are listed on the National Register of Historic Places.

== Geography ==
According to the United States Census Bureau, the city has a total area of 3.65 square miles (9.45 km^{2}), all land.

== Demographics ==
Historical population
Census	Pop.	Note	%±
1890	264		—
1900	254		−3.8%
1910	261		2.8%
1920	205		−21.5%
1930	233		13.7%
1940	256		9.9%
1950	390		52.3%
1960	457		17.2%
1970	831		81.8%
1980	1,508		81.5%
1990	1,625		7.8%
2000	1,675		3.1%
2010	2,821		68.4%
2020	3,473		23.1%
U.S. Decennial Census

=== 2020 census ===
As of the 2020 census, Hillsboro had a population of 3,473. The median age was 30.0 years. 27.9% of residents were under the age of 18 and 9.7% of residents were 65 years of age or older. For every 100 females there were 103.1 males, and for every 100 females age 18 and over there were 102.1 males age 18 and over.

0.0% of residents lived in urban areas, while 100.0% lived in rural areas.

There were 1,147 households in Hillsboro, of which 44.9% had children under the age of 18 living in them. Of all households, 46.2% were married-couple households, 18.5% were households with a male householder and no spouse or partner present, and 25.3% were households with a female householder and no spouse or partner present. About 23.3% of all households were made up of individuals and 9.3% had someone living alone who was 65 years of age or older.

There were 1,227 housing units, of which 6.5% were vacant. The homeowner vacancy rate was 1.4% and the rental vacancy rate was 7.4%.

Racial composition as of the 2020 census
Race	Number	Percent
White	3,161	91.0%
Black or African American	50	1.4%
American Indian and Alaska Native	7	0.2%
Asian	14	0.4%
Native Hawaiian and Other Pacific Islander	0	0.0%
Some other race	40	1.2%
Two or more races	201	5.8%
Hispanic or Latino (of any race)	86	2.5%

=== 2010 census ===
As of the census of 2010, there were 2,821 people, 900 households, and 623 families living in the city. The population density was 772.9 inhabitants per square mile (298.4/km^{2}). There were 957 housing units at an average density of 262.2 per square mile (101.2/km^{2}). The racial makeup of the city was 94.5% White, 2.8% African American, 0.4% Native American, 0.5% Asian, 0.5% from other races, and 1.3% from two or more races. Hispanic or Latino of any race were 2.0% of the population.

There were 900 households, of which 44.2% had children under the age of 18 living with them, 48.3% were married couples living together, 15.9% had a female householder with no husband present, 5.0% had a male householder with no wife present, and 30.8% were non-families. 25.1% of all households were made up of individuals, and 8.2% had someone living alone who was 65 years of age or older. The average household size was 2.69 and the average family size was 3.23.

The median age in the city was 29.2 years. 27.9% of residents were under the age of 18; 13.8% were between the ages of 18 and 24; 31.2% were from 25 to 44; 19% were from 45 to 64; and 8.2% were 65 years of age or older. The gender makeup of the city was 52.0% male and 48.0% female.

=== 2000 census ===
As of the census of 2000, there were 1,675 people, 581 households, and 395 families living in the city. The population density was 701.4 inhabitants per square mile (270.8/km^{2}). There were 620 housing units at an average density of 259.6 per square mile (100.2/km^{2}). The racial makeup of the city was 95.46% White, 2.03% African American, 0.36% Native American, 0.66% Asian, 0.60% from other races, and 0.90% from two or more races. Hispanic or Latino of any race were 2.15% of the population.

There were 581 households, out of which 35.1% had children under the age of 18 living with them, 47.7% were married couples living together, 16.5% had a female householder with no husband present, and 32.0% were non-families. 26.2% of all households were made up of individuals, and 8.3% had someone living alone who was 65 years of age or older. The average household size was 2.60 and the average family size was 3.09.

In the city, the population was spread out, with 27.7% under the age of 18, 13.7% from 18 to 24, 30.8% from 25 to 44, 19.9% from 45 to 64, and 7.9% who were 65 years of age or older. The median age was 31 years. For every 100 females, there were 107.0 males. For every 100 females age 18 and over, there were 106.0 males.

The median income for a household in the city was $36,850, and the median income for a family was $44,000. Males had a median income of $30,880 versus $24,408 for females. The per capita income for the city was $15,585. About 9.7% of families and 14.3% of the population were below the poverty line, including 19.6% of those under age 18 and 9.4% of those age 65 or over.

== Education ==
The main campus of Jefferson College is located in Hillsboro. Jefferson College is a two-year institution that serves the broader Jefferson County area.

Hillsboro R-3 School District is the local school district. The city has 1 high school, Hillsboro High School.

== See also ==
- Autovon
