= Fox High School =

Public school in Missouri, United States

Fox Senior High School

Location
- 751 Jeffco Boulevard; Arnold, Missouri 63010; United States; 38°27′01″N 90°22′17″W

Information
- Type: Comprehensive public high school
- School district: Fox School District
- Principal: Joe Salsman
- Teaching staff: 90.71 (FTE)
- Grades: 9–12
- Enrollment: 1,560 (2025–26)
- Student to teacher ratio: 18.29
- Colors: Red, white, and black
- Athletics conference: Suburban Conference
- Mascot: Warriors
- Website: fhs.foxc6.org

Fox High School is a public high school located in Arnold, Missouri, that is part of the Fox School District. Approximately 2,000 students are currently enrolled. The school is named for Charles Fox, who once owned the land where the campus was built.

== Notable events ==
On October 24, 1988, Republican vice-presidential candidate Dan Quayle addressed the students at Fox High School, listening to questions and discussing the war on drugs.

On July 17, 1993, President Bill Clinton with several members of his cabinet held a "flood summit" at the school during the Great Flood of 1993. During the summit, Clinton promised the governors of flood-damaged states that his administration would not abandon them once the water recedes.

On April 29, 2009, President Barack Obama held a town hall meeting in the auditorium of the school to mark the 100th day of his administration.

== Activities ==
The school officially sponsors several athletic programs, including soccer, cheerleading, men's football (2008 and 2009 Division 6A semi-finalists and quarterfinalists, respectively), volleyball (2008 men's conference tournament semifinalists), track & field, cross country, basketball, wrestling, baseball, softball, and golf. Fox High School is also associated with several private club teams, including men's rugby, hockey, and men's lacrosse (2008 Division 2 State Champions). There are also several activities and clubs created by students with the help of teachers, such as the Chess Club, Lego club, and Cork Kick Club. Fox has several award-winning arts programs, including its marching band, who won 1st overall at the 2017 and 2018 Vallhala Marching Festival. The school boasts broad involvement in numerous other student organizations, including a strong FBLA chapter.

== Notable alumni ==
- Dana Loesch, national spokesperson for the National Rifle Association; talk-show host
- Mike Wells, former NFL player; who played for teams like the Minnesota Vikings, Detroit Lions and the Chicago Bears.
- Kenny Wallace, former NASCAR driver
- Rusty Wallace, former NASCAR driver
