= Herculaneum High School =

Location
- 1 Blackcat Dr, Herculaneum; Herculaneum, MO 63048; 38.2672°N 90.3790°W

Information
- Type: Public High School
- Motto: Educating today for a better tomorrow
- Established: 1915; 111 years ago
- School district: Dunklin R-V School District
- Principal: Stephanie Dix
- Staff: 32.89 (FTE)
- Grades: 9–12
- Enrollment: 488 (2023–2024)
- Student to teacher ratio: 14.84
- Colors: Black and red
- Athletics conference: MSHAA
- Sports: Football, Cross Country, Volleyball, Basketball, Golf, Track, Baseball
- Mascot: Black Cat
- Rival: Hillsboro High School
- Yearbook: Blackcat
- Website: herculaneum.dunklin.k12.mo.us

Herculaneum High School is a public high school in the Dunklin R-V School District in Herculaneum, Missouri, in Greater St. Louis.

== Overview ==
Herculaneum High School was founded in 1915, with its first high school graduating class in 1919. The average ACT score is 19.4 with a 16:1 student to teacher ratio. Approximately 60% of graduating students go on to college. The graduation rate is 89%.

== Energy ==
The Doe Run Company has invested more than $500,000 into the installation of solar panels on Herculaneum High, poised to save Dunklin R-V School District more than $27,000 a year in energy costs.
