= KIRK (FM) =

Radio station in Macon, Missouri

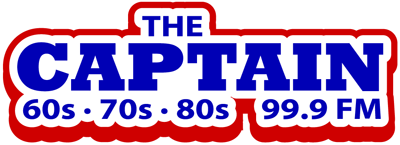
- Macon, Missouri; United States
- Broadcast area: Moberly, Missouri
- Frequency: 99.9 MHz
- RDS: 26e4
- Branding: 99.9 The Captain

Programming
- Format: Classic hits
- Affiliations: Westwood One

Ownership
- Owner: Carter Media LLC; (Carter Media Too LLC)
- Sister stations: KRES; KWIX; KTCM

History
- First air date: 1998

Technical information
- Licensing authority: FCC
- Facility ID: 78275
- Class: C3
- ERP: 12,500 watts
- HAAT: 141 meters (463 ft)
- Transmitter coordinates: 39°36′2.1″N 92°34′24.7″W

Links
- Public license information: Public file; LMS
- Webcast: Listen live
- Website: centralmoinfo.com

KIRK (99.9 FM, "The Captain") is a radio station licensed to serve Macon, Missouri, United States. The station, established in 1998, is owned by Carter Media with the broadcast license held by Carter Media Too LLC.

== Programming ==
KIRK broadcasts a classic hits music format and Kansas City Chiefs to the greater Moberly, Missouri, area.

== History ==
This station received its original construction permit from the Federal Communications Commission on February 13, 1998. The new station was assigned the KIRK call sign by the FCC on March 17, 1998.

In April 1998, permit holder David L. Shepherd filed an application to transfer control of KIRK to a new company called KIRK, LLC, as part of the multi-station Shepherd Group. The transfer was approved by the FCC on April 30, 1998, and the transaction was consummated on May 6, 1998. KIRK received its license to cover from the FCC on September 28, 1998.

On February 28, 2007, the Shepherd Group announced they had reached an agreement to sell KIRK to Dean Radio.TV (Dean Goodman, president/CEO) through its GoodRadio.TV, LLC, holding company as part of a 16-station deal valued at a reported $30.6 million. The deal was approved by the FCC on May 9, 2007, and the transaction was consummated on August 8, 2007.

The Shepherd Group included KJEL-FM and KBNN in Lebanon; KJFF in Festus; KREI and KTJJ in Farmington; KRES and KWIX in Moberly; KIRK in Macon; KOZQ, KOZQ-FM, KJPW, and KFBD-FM in Waynesville; KAAN and KAAN-FM in Bethany; and KMRN and KKWK in Cameron.

As part of an internal reorganization, Dean Radio.TV applied to the FCC in parallel to transfer the license for KIRK from Good Radio.TV, LLC, to the newly formed Moberly/Macon License Company, LLC. The transfer was approved on May 9, 2007, and the transaction was consummated when the sale from the Shepherd Group was completed on August 8, 2007. At the time of the sale, KIRK broadcast an Adult Top 40 music format branded as "Energy 99".

On August 1, 2013, KIRK shifted its format from oldies to classic hits.

In December 2013, GoodRadio.TV and its subsidiaries merged into Digity, LLC. Effective February 25, 2016, Digity and its 124 radio stations were acquired by Alpha Media for $264 million.

On May 7, 2024, Alpha Media laid off all on-air talent for all their Missouri stations without warning, including KIRK and its sister stations.

In May 2025, Connoisseur Media announced its intent to acquire Alpha Media. The FCC approved the sale on August 13, 2025, and the sale was consummated on September 4.

The station was sold to Carter Media in late 2025, and the sale closed February 19, 2026.

== Awards and honors ==
In March 2008, former KIRK/KRES/KWIX program director Brad Boyer was presented a Distinguished Service Award by the Missouri State High School Activities Association. Boyer received the Distinguished Service Award, established by the MSHSAA in 1988, in recognition of his "statewide leadership in the Missouri Sportswriters and Sportscasters Association" and his "lifelong contributions to the ideals of interscholastic activities".
