= KWIX =

Radio station in Moberly, Missouri

KWIX and KWIX-FM

KWIX: Moberly, Missouri; KWIX-FM: Cairo, Missouri; United States
- Broadcast area: Columbia, Missouri
- Frequencies: KWIX: 1230 kHz; KWIX-FM: 92.5 MHz
- Branding: KWIX 1230 AM 92.5 FM Information Radio

Programming
- Format: Talk radio
- Affiliations: NBC News Radio; Compass Media Networks; Premiere Networks; Westwood One

Ownership
- Owner: Carter Media LLC; (Carter Media Too LLC)
- Sister stations: KRES; KIRK; KTCM

History
- First air date: KWIX: 1950; KWIX-FM: 2014
- Former call signs: KWIX: KNCM (1950–1963)

Technical information
- Licensing authority: FCC
- Facility ID: KWIX: 35889; KWIX-FM: 183331
- Class: KWIX: C; KWIX-FM: A
- Power: KWIX: 490 watts (day); 1,000 watts (night)
- ERP: KWIX-FM: 6,000 watts
- HAAT: KWIX-FM: 100 meters (330 ft)
- Transmitter coordinates: KWIX: 39°24′11.1″N 92°25′57.7″W; KWIX-FM: 39°36′2.1″N 92°34′24.7″W

Links
- Public license information: KWIX: Public file; LMS; KWIX-FM: Public file; LMS
- Webcast: Listen live
- Website: centralmoinfo.com

KWIX (1230 AM) is a radio station that broadcasts a talk radio format. Licensed to Moberly, Missouri, United States, the station serves the Moberly area. The station is owned by Carter Media LLC, through licensee Carter Media Too LLC and features programming from NBC News Radio, Compass Media Networks, Premiere Networks, and Westwood One.

Throughout the day the on-air programmers who could be heard on KWIX include, Brad Boyer, Bill Peterson, Brad Tregnago, Aaron Wood, Eric Messersmith, Brian Hauswirth, Matt Tarnawa, Matt Elliott, Brennan Holtzclaw, Dan Patterson and Curt Derr.

In the early 1990s, KWIX and KRES's on-air staff included St. Louis-area transplants such as Bryan Polcyn, Doug Stewart, Mike Roberts and Paul Lewandowski.

This is a reassignment of a callsign. The original KWIX was a shortwave radio station based in San Francisco, California, commissioned by the federal government in World War II. It served as the basis for what later became the Voice of America.

== Ownership ==
It was announced on March 1, 2007, that GoodRadio.TV LLC planned to buy The Shepherd Group of radio stations in Missouri, which operated 16 small-market radio stations. The deal was reportedly worth $30.6 million.

Dean Goodman formed the new company, GoodRadio.TV. He is the former president and chief executive officer of the television broadcasting company Ion Media Networks, a role he stepped down from in October 2006.

The Shepherd Group included KJEL and KBNN in Lebanon; KJFF in Festus; KREI and KTJJ in Farmington; KRES and KWIX in Moberly; KIRK in Macon; KOZQ-FM, KJPW and KFBD-FM in Waynesville; KAAN-FM and KAAN in Bethany; and KMRN and KKWK in Cameron.

GoodRadio.TV merged into Digity, LLC in December 2013, owning a combined 124 radio stations. The company was later acquired by Alpha Media for $264 million on February 25, 2016.

Alpha Media laid off all on-air talent for their Missouri stations without warning on May 7, 2024, including KWIX, KWIX-FM, and its sister stations. On May 20, Alpha Media announced the KWIX duo would flip to an all-podcast format as "Podcast Radio Missouri" on June 17, following a deal signed between Alpha and the stations' new broadcast affiliate, the British-founded Podcast Radio.

Connoisseur Media announced its intent to acquire Alpha Media in May 2025. The FCC approved the sale on August 13, 2025, and the sale was consummated on September 4.

The station was sold to Carter Media in late 2025, and the sale closed February 19, 2026.
