= KTJJ =

Radio station in Farmington, Missouri

- Farmington, Missouri; United States
- Broadcast area: Ste. Genevieve; St. Louis; Cape Girardeau
- Frequency: 98.5 MHz
- Branding: J98 The Boot

Programming
- Format: Country music
- Affiliations: ABC News Radio; Premiere Networks; Westwood One

Ownership
- Owner: Connoisseur Media; (Alpha Media Licensee LLC)
- Sister stations: KREI, KJFF

Technical information
- Licensing authority: FCC
- Facility ID: 35533
- Class: C
- ERP: 100,000 watts
- HAAT: 317 meters (1,040 ft)
- Transmitter coordinates: 37°43′7.00″N 90°33′1.00″W

Links
- Public license information: Public file; LMS
- Webcast: Listen Live
- Website: KTJJ Online

KTJJ (98.5 FM) is a radio station broadcasting from Farmington, Missouri. KTJJ has an extensive coverage area, heard from Jefferson City to south-eastern Illinois from west to east, and St. Louis to the Missouri-Arkansas border from north to south.

== Programming ==
KTJJ has a country music format, with there being more news and information during the daytime hours.

== Ownership ==
On March 1, 2007, it was announced that GoodRadio.TV LLC planned to buy The Shepherd Group of radio stations in Missouri. The Shepherd Group operates 16 small-market radio stations in Missouri. The deal was reportedly worth $30.6 million.

Dean Goodman recently formed the new company, GoodRadio.TV. He is the former president and chief executive officer of the television broadcasting company ION Media Networks Inc. Goodman stepped down from ION Media Networks in October 2006.

The Shepherd Group includes KJEL-FM and KBNN in Lebanon; KJFF in Festus; KREI and KTJJ in Farmington; KRES and KWIX in Moberly; KIRK in Macon; KIIK, KOZQ-FM, KJPW and KFBD-FM in Waynesville; KAAN-FM and KAAN in Bethany; and KMRN and KKWK in Cameron.

In December 2013, GoodRadio.TV merged into Digity, LLC. Effective February 25, 2016, Digity and its 124 radio stations were acquired by Alpha Media for $264 million.
