= KAAN-FM =

Radio station in Bethany, Missouri

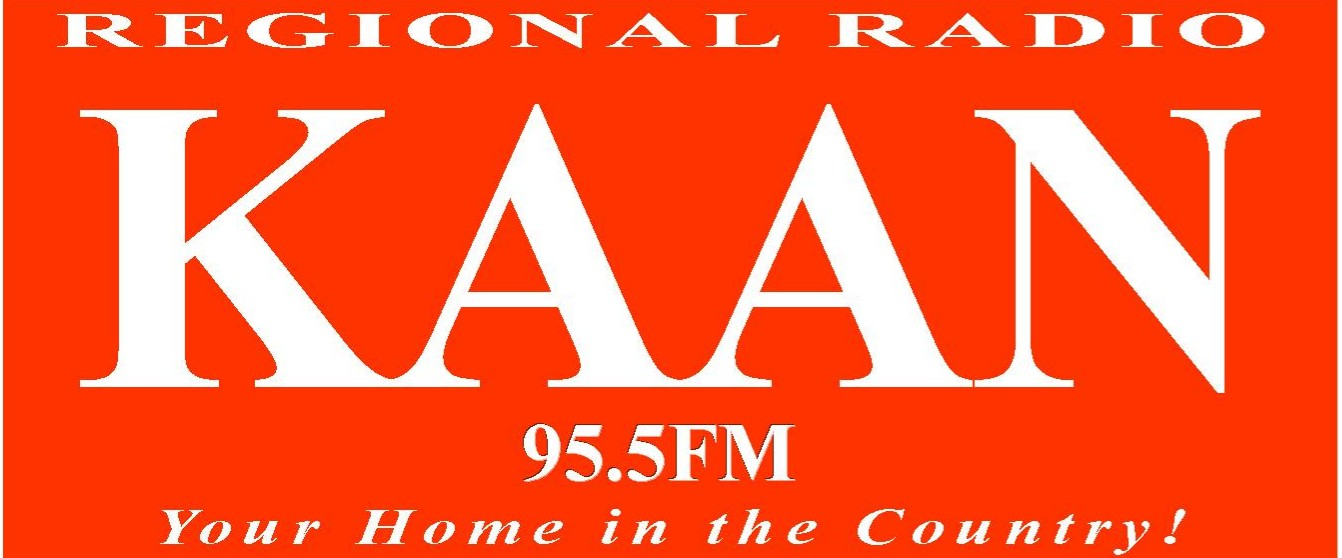
- Bethany, Missouri; United States
- Broadcast area: Northwest Missouri
- Frequency: 95.5 MHz
- Branding: KAAN 95.5 FM

Programming
- Format: Country music
- Affiliations: NBC News Radio

Ownership
- Owner: Carter Media; (Carter Media Too LLC)
- Sister stations: KAAN; KMRN; KKWK

History
- First air date: October 27, 1978

Technical information
- Licensing authority: FCC
- Facility ID: 31005
- Class: C2
- ERP: 50,000 watts
- HAAT: 108 meters (354 ft)
- Transmitter coordinates: 40°15′22.9″N 94°9′23.8″W

Links
- Public license information: Public file; LMS
- Webcast: Listen live
- Website: www.northwestmoinfo.com/stations/95-5-regional-radio-kaan/

KAAN-FM (95.5 MHz) is a commercial radio station broadcasting a country music radio format. Licensed to Bethany, Missouri, United States, the station is owned by Carter Media.

KAAN-FM first signed on the air on October 27, 1978. The transmitter tower is located six miles west of Bethany on U.S. Route 136 at West 140th Avenue. KAAN-FM has an effective radiated power (ERP) of 50,000 watts. It covers much of Northwestern Missouri and some of Southern Iowa.

== Ownership ==
On March 1, 2007, it was announced that GoodRadio.TV LLC planned to buy The Shepherd Group of radio stations in Missouri. The Shepherd Group operated 16 small-market radio stations in Missouri. The deal was reportedly worth $30.6 million.

Dean Goodman formed the new company, GoodRadio.TV. He is the former president and chief executive officer of the television broadcasting company ION Media Networks Inc. Goodman stepped down from ION Media Networks in October 2006.

The Shepherd Group included KJEL-FM and KBNN in Lebanon; KJFF in Festus; KREI and KTJJ in Farmington; KRES and KWIX in Moberly; KIRK in Macon; KIIK, KOZQ-FM, KJPW and KFBD-FM in Waynesville; KAAN-FM and KAAN in Bethany; and KMRN and KKWK in Cameron.

In December 2013, GoodRadio.TV merged into Digity, LLC. Effective February 25, 2016, Digity and its 124 radio stations were acquired by Alpha Media for $264 million.

In May 2025, Connoisseur Media announced its intent to acquire Alpha Media. The FCC approved the sale on August 13, 2025, and the sale was consummated on September 4.

The station was sold to Carter Media in late 2025, and the sale closed February 19, 2026.
