= KAAN (AM) =

Radio station in Bethany, Missouri

- Bethany, Missouri; United States
- Frequency: 870 kHz
- Branding: Sports Radio 870 AM 103.7 FM

Programming
- Format: Sports
- Affiliations: ESPN Radio; Infinity Sports Network; Kansas City Chiefs Radio Network; St. Louis Cardinals Radio Network

Ownership
- Owner: Carter Media; (Carter Media Too LLC)
- Sister stations: KAAN-FM; KKWK; KMRN

History
- First air date: December 3, 1983
- Former call signs: KAAN (1983–1996); KIRK (1996–1998)

Technical information
- Licensing authority: FCC
- Facility ID: 31004
- Class: D
- Power: 930 watts day
- Transmitter coordinates: 40°15′23″N 94°9′23.8″W
- Translator: 103.7 K279AP (Bethany)

Links
- Public license information: Public file; LMS
- Webcast: Listen live
- Website: www.northwestmoinfo.com/stations/sport-radio-870-am-103-7-fm/

KAAN (870 kHz) is a commercial radio station located in Bethany, Missouri, and serving northwest Missouri and southern Iowa. The station broadcasts a sports radio format. KAAN is owned by Carter Media and has a daytime-only license. WWL in New Orleans is the 50,000-watt Class A clear-channel station on 870 AM, so KAAN must sign off at sunset to avoid interfering with WWL. KAAN can also be heard on an FM translator station K279AP at 103.7 MHz. The translator operates 24 hours a day, even when the AM station is off the air at night. The transmitter tower is located six miles west of Bethany on U.S. Route 136 at West 140th Avenue.

KAAN is a network affiliate of ESPN Radio with some programming from Infinity Sports Network. It also carries NFL games from the Kansas City Chiefs and MLB games from the St. Louis Cardinals. It first signed on the air on December 3, 1983.

Previous logo

== Ownership ==
On March 1, 2007, it was announced that GoodRadio.TV LLC planned to buy The Shepherd Group of radio stations in Missouri. The Shepherd Group operated 16 small-market radio stations in Missouri. The deal was reportedly worth $30.6 million.

Dean Goodman formed the new company, GoodRadio.TV. He is the former president and chief executive officer of the television broadcasting company ION Media Networks Inc. Goodman stepped down from ION Media Networks in October 2006.

The Shepherd Group included KJEL-FM and KBNN in Lebanon; KJFF in Festus; KREI and KTJJ in Farmington; KRES and KWIX in Moberly; KIRK in Macon; KIIK, KOZQ-FM, KJPW and KFBD-FM in Waynesville; KAAN-FM and KAAN in Bethany; and KMRN and KKWK in Cameron.

In December 2013, GoodRadio.TV merged into Digity, LLC. Effective February 25, 2016, Digity and its 124 radio stations were acquired by Alpha Media for $264 million.

In May 2025, Connoisseur Media announced its intent to acquire Alpha Media. The FCC approved the sale on August 13, 2025, and the sale was consummated on September 4.

The station was sold to Carter Media in late 2025, and the sale closed February 19, 2026.
