= KRES =

Radio station in Moberly, Missouri

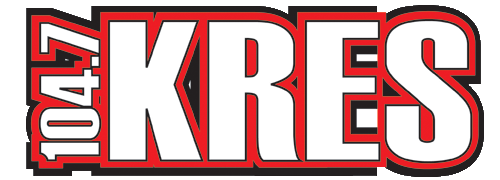
- Moberly, Missouri; United States
- Broadcast area: Columbia, Missouri; Macon, Missouri
- Frequency: 104.7 MHz
- Branding: Heartland Country

Programming
- Format: Country
- Affiliations: Westwood One; Fox News Radio; United Stations Radio Networks

Ownership
- Owner: Carter Media LLC; (Carter Media Too LLC)
- Sister stations: KWIX; KIRK; KTCM

History
- First air date: 1966

Technical information
- Facility ID: 35890
- Class: C
- ERP: 100,000 watts
- HAAT: 311 meters (1,020 ft)
- Transmitter coordinates: 39°27′35.1″N 92°42′7.6″W

Links
- Webcast: Listen live
- Website: www.centralmoinfo.com

KRES (104.7 FM) is a radio station broadcasting a country music format. Licensed to Moberly, Missouri, United States, the station serves the Columbia, Missouri, area. The station is currently owned by Carter Media LLC, through licensee Carter Media Too LLC, and features programming from Fox News Radio and United Stations Radio Networks.

The first station to use the KRES call sign was on 1550 AM in St. Joseph, Missouri, which went on the air in 1947 playing hits from the 1920s, 1930s, and 1940s. That station changed its call sign to KKJO in 1962 and began playing hits from the 1950s and 1960s.

Today, KRES broadcasts on 104.7 FM with a country music with spot news and agricultural news format. KRES is the Moberly affiliate for St. Louis Cardinals baseball.

Until May 7, 2024, the on-air programmers who could be heard on KRES included Brad Boyer, Bill Peterson, J.B. Connoley, Dan Patterson, Adam Hildebrandt, and Kyle Hill. On that day, the entire on-air staff were dismissed by Alpha Media management.

In the late 1980s, on air staff included Jack Larkin, Jim Coyle, Bob Bagby, Ron Block, Larry Weller, Doug Owens and Rich Cain. In the early 1990s, KWIX and KRES's on-air staff included St. Louis-area transplants such as Bryan Polcyn, Doug Stewart, Mike Roberts and Paul Lewandowski.

== Ownership ==
On March 1, 2007, it was announced that GoodRadio.TV LLC planned to buy The Shepherd Group of radio stations in Missouri. The Shepherd Group operated 16 small-market radio stations in Missouri. The deal was reportedly worth $30.6 million.

Dean Goodman formed the new company, GoodRadio.TV. He is the former president and chief executive officer of the television broadcasting company Ion Media Networks. Goodman stepped down from Ion Media Networks in October 2006.

The Shepherd Group included KJEL and KBNN in Lebanon; KJFF in Festus; KREI and KTJJ in Farmington; KRES-FM and KWIX in Moberly; KIRK in Macon; KIIK, KOZQ-FM, KJPW and KFBD-FM in Waynesville; KAAN-FM and KAAN in Bethany; and KMRN and KKWK in Cameron.

In December 2013, GoodRadio.TV merged into Digity, LLC. Effective February 25, 2016, Digity and its 124 radio stations were acquired by Alpha Media for $264 million.

On March 7, 2024, Alpha Media laid off all on-air talent for all of their Missouri stations without warning, including KRES and its sister stations.

In May 2025, Connoisseur Media announced its intent to acquire Alpha Media. The FCC approved the sale on August 13, 2025, and the sale was consummated on September 4.

The station was sold to Carter Media in late 2025, and the sale closed February 19, 2026.
