= GoodRadio.TV =

American radio broadcasting company

Good Radio Networks, LLC
- Corporate logo of GoodRadio.TV
- Company type: Public
- Industry: Radio broadcasting
- Founded: 2007
- Defunct: 2013
- Fate: Acquired by Alpha Media
- Headquarters: West Palm Beach, Florida
- Key people: Dean Goodman
- Website: GoodRadio.TV

Good Radio Networks LLC, doing business as GoodRadio.TV, was a West Palm Beach, Florida based radio ownership group headed by former Pax president Dean Goodman. Partners in this venture include former NAB Chairman Eddie Fritz, and former founder of NextMedia, Carl Hirsch.

GoodRadio was established in late-2006 with the purchase of six stations in Iowa. It later acquired The Shepherd Group's 8 FM and 8 AM stations, all in Missouri, in February 2007. In 2007, Good Radio had plans to acquire 200 smaller-market radio stations from Clear Channel Communications, but the deal fell through when its financing group, American Securities Capital Partners, objected to the deal's $452 million cost.

In 2013, GoodRadio was folded into a larger holding company known as Digity, LLC, also owned by Goodman, joining a sister group of stations in West Palm under the banner West Palm Broadcasting. The reorganization came alongside Digity's purchase of NextMedia. Digity was in turn acquired by Larry Wilson's Alpha Media in February 2016.

== List of stations ==
=== In Iowa ===
KMCD 1570 AM in Fairfield, Iowa
KKFD 95.9 FM in Fairfield, Iowa
KGRN 1410 AM in Grinnell, Iowa
KRTI 106.7 FM in Grinnell, Iowa
KCOB 1280 AM in Newton, Iowa
KCOB-FM 95.9 FM in Newton, Iowa

=== In Missouri ===
KAAN 870 AM in Bethany, Missouri
KAAN 95.5 FM in Bethany, Missouri
KMRN 1360 FM in Cameron, Missouri
KKWK 100.1 FM in Cameron, Missouri
KDKD 1280 AM in Clinton, Missouri
KDKD 95.3 FM in Clinton, Missouri
KREI 800 AM in Farmington, Missouri
KTJJ 98.5 FM in Farmington, Missouri
KJFF 1400 AM in Farmington, Missouri
KBNN 750 AM in Lebanon, Missouri
KJEL 103.7 FM in Lebanon, Missouri
KXEA 104.9 FM in Lowry City, Missouri
KIRK 99.9 FM in Macon, Missouri
KTCM 97.3 FM in Madison, Missouri
KWIX 1230 AM in Moberly, Missouri
KRES 104.7 FM in Moberly, Missouri
KJPW 1390 AM in Waynesville, Missouri
KFBD 97.9 FM in Waynesville, Missouri
KIIK 1270 AM in Waynesville, Missouri
KOZQ 102.3 FM in Waynesville, Missouri

Despite the use of "TV" in its name, GoodRadio.TV never had any television stations in its ownership group.
