= KKWK =

Radio station in Cameron, Missouri

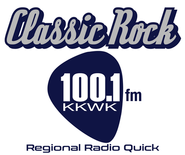
- Cameron, Missouri; United States
- Broadcast area: Kansas City, Missouri
- Frequency: 100.1 MHz
- Branding: Classic Rock 100.1 KKWK

Programming
- Format: Classic rock
- Affiliations: Fox News Radio; Westwood One

Ownership
- Owner: Carter Media; (Carter Media Too LLC)
- Sister stations: KAAN; KAAN-FM; KMRN

History
- First air date: 1995 (as KNOZ)
- Former call signs: KDEE (1989–1994); KNOZ (1994–1999)

Technical information
- Licensing authority: FCC
- Facility ID: 50745
- Class: C2
- ERP: 50,000 watts
- HAAT: 150 meters (490 ft)
- Transmitter coordinates: 39°57′28″N 94°6′55.8″W

Links
- Public license information: Public file; LMS
- Webcast: Listen live
- Website: northwestmoinfo.com

KKWK (100.1 FM) is an American radio station broadcasting a classic rock music format. Licensed to Cameron, Missouri, United States, the station serves the rural areas north of the Kansas City metropolitan area as well as serves as a rimshot into the St. Joseph area. The station is owned by Carter Media and the broadcast license is held by Carter Media Too LLC. The callsign was chosen in tribute to an older St. Louis station, KWK.

Station studios are located near the prison complex on Cameron's north side. Its transmitter is located some distance north of Cameron along U.S. Route 69 in rural Daviess County.

== Programming ==
KKWK is a classic rock music formatted station with a focus on community information, including local and regional news, weather, farm, and sports information. Branded as "Classic Rock 100.1, Regional Radio QUICK", the station is an affiliate of Fox News Radio as well as MissouriNet and the Brownfield agricultural news network. The morning programming is hosted by Nathan Steudle. Included in the morning hours are newscasts, sportscasts, the Breakfast Club, and a tradio program called Trading Post. Program director Chris Ward also serves as news and sports director for the station. Afternoon host Nate Gonner also produces and hosts several sports features. Sports programming on KKWK includes high school sports, Kansas City Royals baseball, Northwest Missouri State University football.

== Ownership ==
On March 1, 2007, it was announced that GoodRadio.TV LLC planned to buy The Shepherd Group of radio stations in Missouri. The Shepherd Group operated 16 small-market radio stations in Missouri. The deal was reportedly worth $30.6 million.

Dean Goodman formed the new company, GoodRadio.TV. He is the former president and chief executive officer of the television broadcasting company ION Media Networks Inc. Goodman stepped down from ION Media Networks in October 2006.

The Shepherd Group included KJEL-FM and KBNN in Lebanon; KJFF in Festus; KREI and KTJJ in Farmington; KRES and KWIX in Moberly; KIRK in Macon; KIIK, KOZQ-FM, KJPW and KFBD-FM in Waynesville; KAAN-FM and KAAN in Bethany; and KMRN and KKWK in Cameron.

In December 2013, GoodRadio.TV merged into Digity, LLC. Effective February 25, 2016, Digity and its 124 radio stations were acquired by Alpha Media for $264 million.

In May 2025, Connoisseur Media announced its intent to acquire Alpha Media. The FCC approved the sale on August 13, 2025, and the sale was consummated on September 4.

The station was sold to Carter Media in late 2025, and the sale closed February 19, 2026.
