= KIIK =

KIIK or Kiik may refer to:

== People ==
- Kiik (surname), an Estonian-language surname

== Other uses ==
- KIIK (AM), a radio station (1270 AM) licensed to Waynesville, Missouri, United States
- KIIK-FM, a radio station (104.9 FM) licensed to DeWitt, Iowa, United States
- KOZQ-FM, a radio station (102.3 FM) licensed to Waynesville, Missouri, which held the call sign KIIK-FM from 2007 to 2011
- KKFD-FM, a radio station (95.9 FM) licensed to Fairfield, Iowa, which held the call sign KIIK-FM from 1989 to 2007
- WLLR-FM, a radio station (103.7 FM) licensed to Davenport, Iowa, United States, which held the call sign KIIK from 1972 to 1989
