= Turley, Missouri =

Extinct town in Texas County, Missouri

Coordinates: 37°26′48″N 92°10′56″W

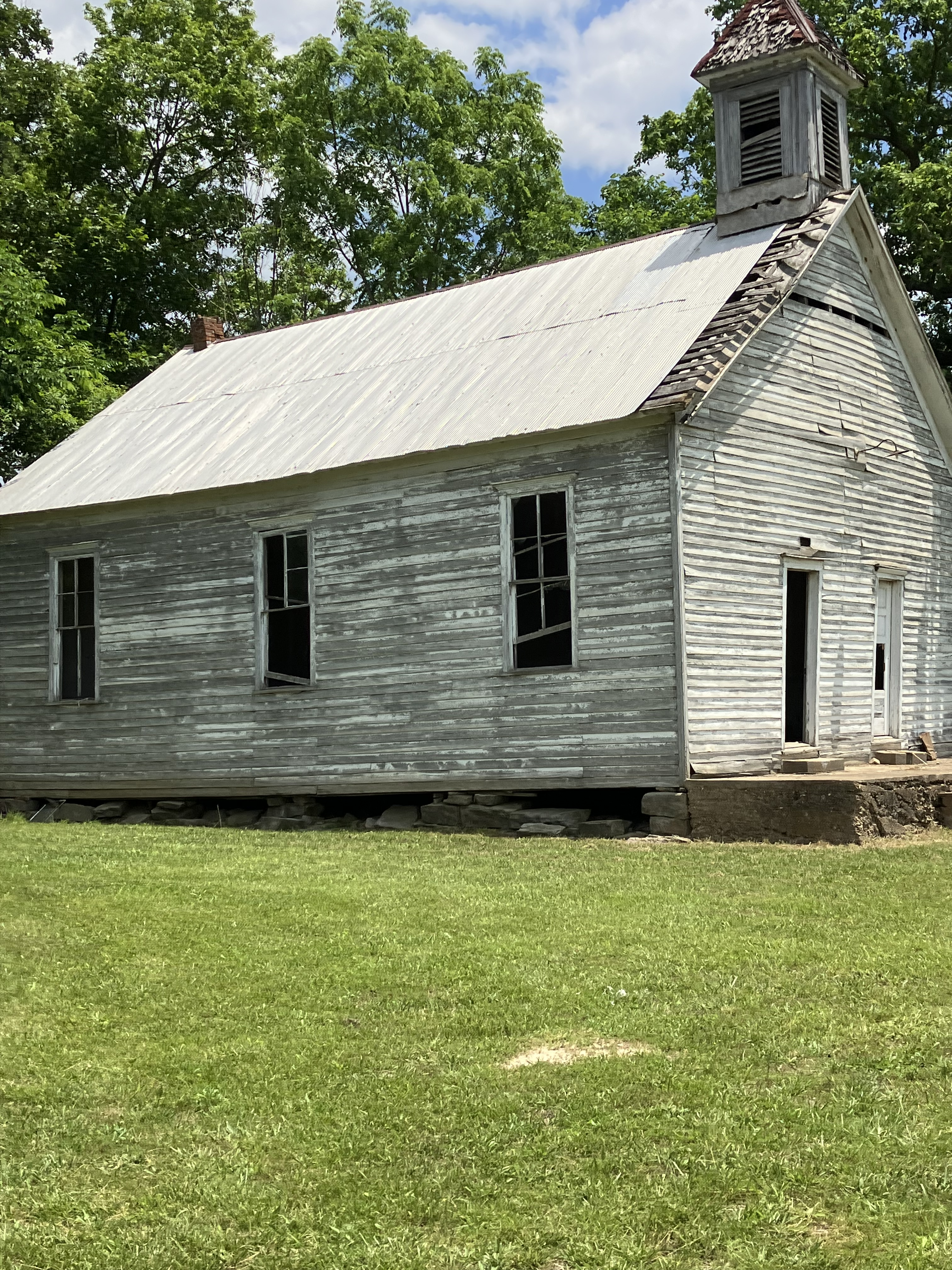
Liberty Baptist Church Building - May 29, 2023

Turley is an extinct town in Texas County, in the U.S. state of Missouri. The GNIS classifies it as a populated place. The community is located on Roubidoux Creek, approximately two miles downstream (northwest) of Roubidoux. The community of Plato is about 4.5 miles to the northwest.

A post office called Turley was established in 1886, and remained in operation until 1949. The community has the name of Turley Embree, the son of an early postmaster.

Liberty Baptist Church at Turley was the second church organized in Texas County. Organized in 1848, the first church building was erected in 1857. The second church building, though in disrepair, is still standing next to the cemetery.

The Liberty School was established a few years after the church.

In the 1960s the skeleton of the old mill still stood in the community. "It was run by a water wheel and ground corn on stone burrs. One of the first roller mills to make flour was later added and was then powered by steam. The mill would run from daylight until dark, and many times all night, six days a week." The mill had three stories and operated until the turn-of-the-century with power from an overshot wooden wheel. The steam boiler and machinery was used until operations ceased about 1935.

At one time, Turley had a drug store, a doctor, three store buildings-two with lodge halls upstairs. The Masons, Odd Fellows, and Woodsmen of the World met at Turley.

The "J. M. Gladden" General Store housed the post office in the back on a raised platform with the letter boxes to the side. The store sold "everything anybody ever needed!"

Pictures of remnants of Turley's buildings can be found at Mill Pictures.com.

== Notable people ==
- Mack Gladden (1909–1985), American football player and coach
