= Matt Stites =

American baseball player (born 1990)

- Pitcher
- Born: May 28, 1990 (age 36); Festus, Missouri, U.S.
- Batted: Left Threw: Right

MLB debut
- June 19, 2014, for the Arizona Diamondbacks

Last appearance
- October 2, 2015, for the Arizona Diamondbacks

MLB statistics
- Win–loss record: 0–0
- Earned run average: 7.13
- Strikeouts: 32
- Stats at Baseball Reference

Teams
- Arizona Diamondbacks (2014–2015)

Matthew Steven Stites (born May 28, 1990) is an American former professional baseball pitcher. He pitched in Major League Baseball (MLB) from 2014 to 2015 for the Arizona Diamondbacks.

== Career ==
=== Amateur ===
Stites attended Festus High School in Festus, Missouri. He then enrolled at Jefferson College, where he played for the college baseball team. He had a 9–2 win-loss record and a 1.69 earned run average (ERA) as a sophomore and was named a junior college All-American. In 2010, he played collegiate summer baseball with the Falmouth Commodores of the Cape Cod Baseball League. The Chicago Cubs selected Stites in the 33rd round, with the 1,000th overall selection, of the 2010 MLB draft. Stites opted not to sign, and instead transferred to the University of Missouri, where he played for the Missouri Tigers baseball team. He led the team with 92 innings pitched.

=== San Diego Padres ===
The San Diego Padres selected Stites in the 17th round, with the 533rd overall selection, of the 2011 Major League Baseball draft. He split his first professional season between the rookie-level Arizona League Padres and Low-A Eugene Emeralds.

Stites spent the 2012 season with the Single-A Fort Wayne TinCaps. In 42 appearances, he compiled a 2-0 record and 0.74 ERA with 60 strikeouts and 13 saves across 48 2/3 innings pitched. Stites began 2013 with the Double-A San Antonio Missions, logging a 2-2 record and 2.08 ERA with 51 strikeouts and 14 saves across 46 appearances.

=== Arizona Diamondbacks ===
On July 31, 2013, the Padres traded Stites along with Joe Thatcher to the Arizona Diamondbacks in exchange for Ian Kennedy. He missed the remainder of the 2013 season following an emergency appendectomy.

On June 19, 2014, Stites was recalled to Arizona's roster, replacing Tony Campana. In 37 appearances for the Diamondbacks during his rookie campaign, Stites recorded a 5.73 ERA with 26 strikeouts over 33 innings of work. Stites began the 2015 season in the minors, and was recalled to the major leagues on June 30. In 11 appearances for Arizona, he struggled to a 12.46 ERA with 6 strikeouts across 8 2/3 innings pitched.

On January 13, 2016, Stites was designated for assignment following the acquisition of Cody Hall. He cleared waivers and was sent outright to the Triple-A Reno Aces on January 21. In 47 appearances split between Reno and the Double-A Mobile BayBears, he posted a combined 5-2 record and 2.75 ERA with 46 strikeouts and 16 saves across 52 1/3 innings pitched.

Stites returned to Reno for the 2017 season, but struggled to a 5.93 ERA with 16 strikeouts in 27 1/3 innings pitched across 23 appearances out of the bullpen. Stites was released by the Diamondbacks organization on July 3, 2017.

=== York Revolution ===
On March 22, 2018, Stites signed with the York Revolution of the Atlantic League of Professional Baseball. He announced his retirement on April 4, without making an appearance for the team.

== Personal life ==
Stites grew up as a fan of the St. Louis Cardinals. His older brother, Cody, serves in the United States Air Force.
