= Brittany Borman =

American athlete (born 1989)

Personal information
- Nationality: American
- Born: July 1, 1989 (age 36) St. Louis, Missouri
- Height: 5 ft 11 in (1.80 m)
- Weight: 170 lb (77 kg)

Sport
- Sport: Track and field
- Event(s): Javelin throw Discus throw
- College team: Oklahoma Sooners ('09-'12); UCLA Bruins ('08-'09)
- Club: New York Athletic Club
- Coached by: Brian Blutreich

Achievements and titles
- Personal best(s): Javelin throw: 64.75 m Discus: 56.72 m Shot put (outdoor): 14.99 m Shot put (indoor): 15.60 m

Brittany Borman (born July 1, 1989) is an American track and field athlete who competes primarily in the discus and the javelin throw. She is a four-time NCAA Track and Field Champion, winning the javelin in 2010, 2011, and 2012, and the discus in 2010. In 2012, she won the US Olympic Trials in the javelin and represented the United States at the 2012 Summer Olympics. She also represented the US at the 2016 Olympic Games.

== Early life ==
Brittany Borman was born July 1, 1989, in St. Louis, Missouri to Richard and Laura Borman. She first became involved with track and field at age six, competing with her two sisters - Danielle and Breanne. By the time she entered high school, Borman had tried nearly every track and field event. At Festus High School, she competed in shot put, discus, long jump, 100 m hurdles, triple jump and high jump. By the time she graduated in 2008, she was a four team All-Metro track star. She won state championships in high jump (5 ft-4 in) as a sophomore and in both the discus (150 ft-5 in) and shot put (44 ft-10.25 in) as a junior. In her senior year, she suffered a hamstring injury before the state finals, but still managed to win the discus (135 ft-9 in) and shot put (42 ft-8 in) titles.

In 2006, Borman won the javelin event at the USATF Junior Olympics with a throw of 42.49 metres (139.4 ft) and finished third in the heptathlon with a score of 4538 points. In 2007, she won both the javelin (42.41 m (139 ft 2 in) and shot put (13.48 m (44 ft 3 in) at the AAU Junior Olympics.

== Athletic career ==
After high school, Borman was accepted to UCLA on an athletic scholarship. She planned to follow in the footsteps of her idol Jackie Joyner-Kersee and compete the heptathlon. However, after one season she transferred to the University of Oklahoma and decided to concentrate on the discus and javelin exclusively.

In 2010, Borman became second the NCAA Championships in the javelin with a throw of 53.00 metres (173.88 ft) and in discus with a throw of 54.33 metres (178.2 ft). In 2011 and 2012, she repeated as NCAA javelin champion, with throws of 54.32 metres (178.2 ft) and 56.27 metres (184.6 ft) respectively. Additionally, she has won four Big Twelve titles and is a four-time All-American. She holds the Oklahoma school record in both the javelin and discus.

Borman competed in the US National Championship in 2010 and 2011, finishing seventh in the javelin both years. She qualified for the 2012 Olympic Trials in the javelin. Entering the final round of competition, she was in third place with three spots in the 2012 Summer Olympics up for grabs. However, she had never thrown the Olympic "A" Standard of 61.00 metres (200.13 ft) and thus was not in a position to make the Olympic team. On her final throw, she exceeded her personal best by 2.08 metres (6 ft 10 in), turning in a distance of 61.51 metres (201.8 ft). With the throw, she won the event and made the Olympic team. "I didn’t really know what happened differently [on the last throw]," Borman remarked. "I prayed before it and I am still in shock about how far I threw." She will be joined at the Olympics by Oklahoma teammate and close friend Tia Brooks, who placed third in the shot put.

At the 2012 Olympics, Borman's best throw during the qualifying round was 59.27 meters. She placed 8th in her group (15th overall) and did not qualify for the final.

Borman is coached by former Olympian, Todd Riech, and is sponsored by Nike.

2014 #2 ranked Javelin in the United States by Track and Field News.

== Personal life ==
Borman credits a mission trip to Nicaragua for being the thing that has most shaped her life. She currently lives in DeSoto, Missouri.
