= Festus Memorial Airport =

Airport in Missouri

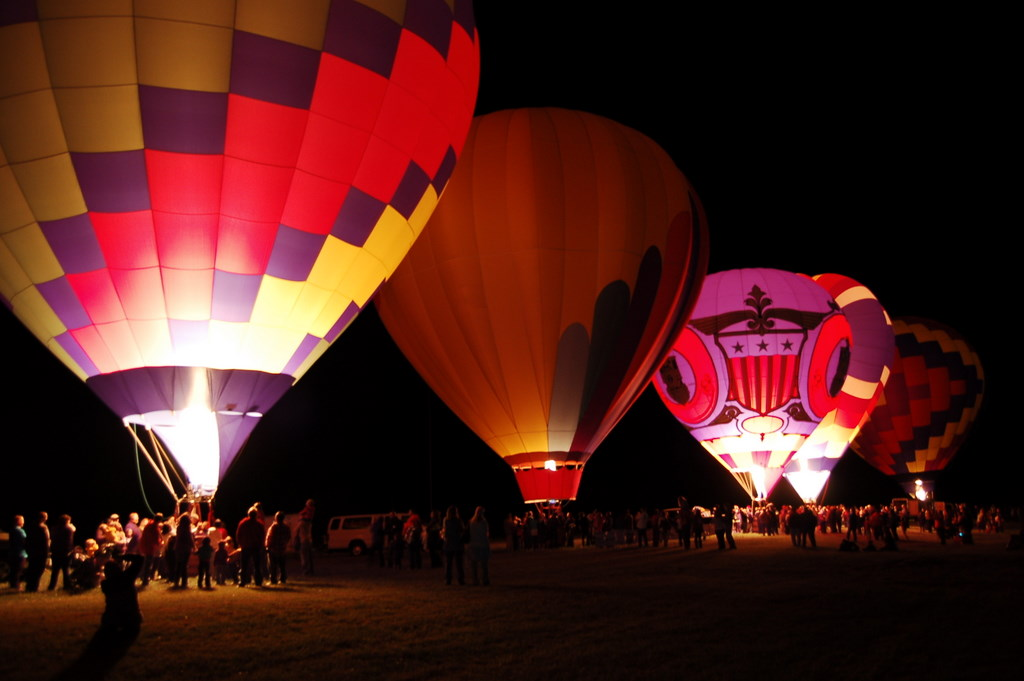
- IATA: none; ICAO: KFES; FAA LID: FES

Summary
- Airport type: Public use
- Owner: Wings Portco, Inc.
- Serves: Festus, Missouri
- Elevation AMSL: 433 ft (132 m)
- Coordinates: 38°11′42″N 090°23′08″W
- Website: FestusAirport.net

Map
- Location of airport in Missouri FES (the United States)

Runways
Direction	Length		Surface
Direction	ft	m	Surface
1/19	2,202	671	Asphalt

Statistics (2019)
- Aircraft operations: 9,006
- Based aircraft: 25
- Source: Federal Aviation Administration

Festus Memorial Airport (ICAO: KFES, FAA LID: FES) was a privately owned, public-use, individual airport located two nautical miles (4 km) south of the central business district of Festus, a city in Jefferson County, Missouri, United States.

Although many U.S. airports use the same three-letter location identifier for the FAA and IATA, this airport was assigned FES by the FAA but had no designation from the IATA.

== Facilities and aircraft ==
Festus Memorial Airport sat on an area of 72 acres (29 ha) at an elevation of 433 feet (132 m) above mean sea level. It had one runway designated 1/19 with an asphalt surface measuring 2,202 by 49 feet (671 x 15 m).

For the 12-month period ending December 31, 2019, the airport had 9,006 individual operations, an average of 25 per day: 99.9% general aviation and <0.1% military. At that time there were 25 aircraft based at this airport: 24 single-engine aircraft based at this airport, and one multi-engine aircraft. This airport is permanently closed as of January 2023.

== Permanent closure ==
In August 2022, after months of rumors it was announced that the owner of the property that the airport was situated on was selling the property to develop a new industrial district. The airport closed on September 27, 2022. More than 20 air frames had to be relocated from hangars due to the closure, and there is currently not an airport in Jefferson County.

=== Industrial Park ===
Jefferson County will put up $7.25 million dollars to fund necessary infrastructure for the industrial project, dubbed Project Redbird, while Crystal City council members voted to annex property necessary for the project.

== See also ==
- List of airports in Missouri
