= Roubidoux Spring =

Coordinates: 37.8249°N 92.2015°W

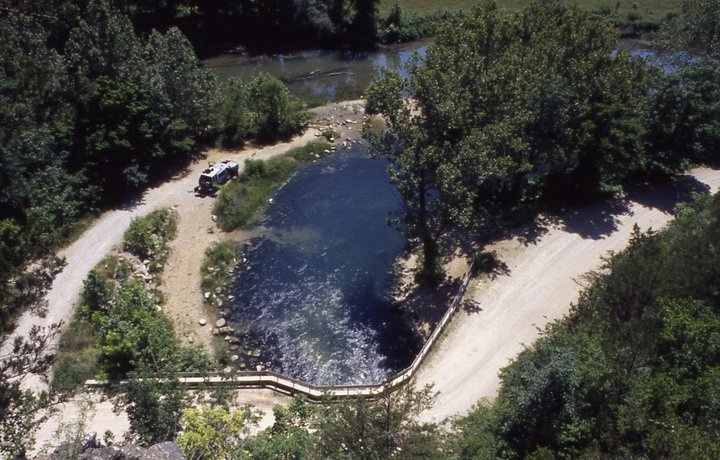
- A hill top view of the spring

Location
- Country: United States
- State: Missouri
- Region: Ozark Plateau

Physical characteristics
- Source: Roubidoux Creek watershed
  - location: Salem Plateau, Ozark Plateau, Missouri
- Mouth: Roubidoux Creek
  - location: near Waynesville, Pulaski County, Ozark Plateau, Missouri
- Length: 0.01 mi (0.016 km)
- Discharge
  - location: Roubidoux Springest
  - average: 58 cu ft/s (1.6 m^{3}/s)est

Roubidoux Spring is a second magnitude freshwater spring located within the city limits of Waynesville in the Missouri Ozarks. The spring discharges from the base of a rock ledge that has been capped by a large concrete wall, built to hold the road that passes over the spring. Spring water flows a very short distance before adding its waters to the Roubidoux Creek. A city park with trails and a board walk has been developed around the spring. This spring is noted as having an average discharge of 58.3 ft³/s. However, due to very limited discharge data, an accurate description of the flow of this particular spring may be difficult to find. This could be a first magnitude spring – over 100 ft³/s. According to some lists, this ranks as the 15th largest spring in the state. The area near this spring has very intense karst topography, many caves, springs and large sink holes are present within a few miles of this spring.

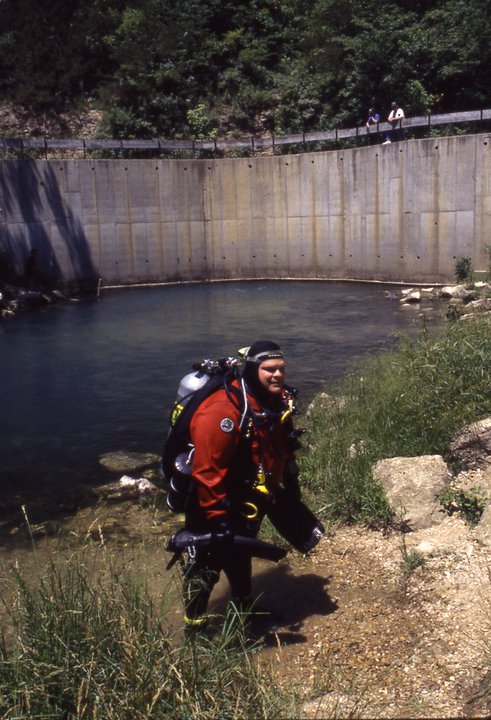
Cave diver.

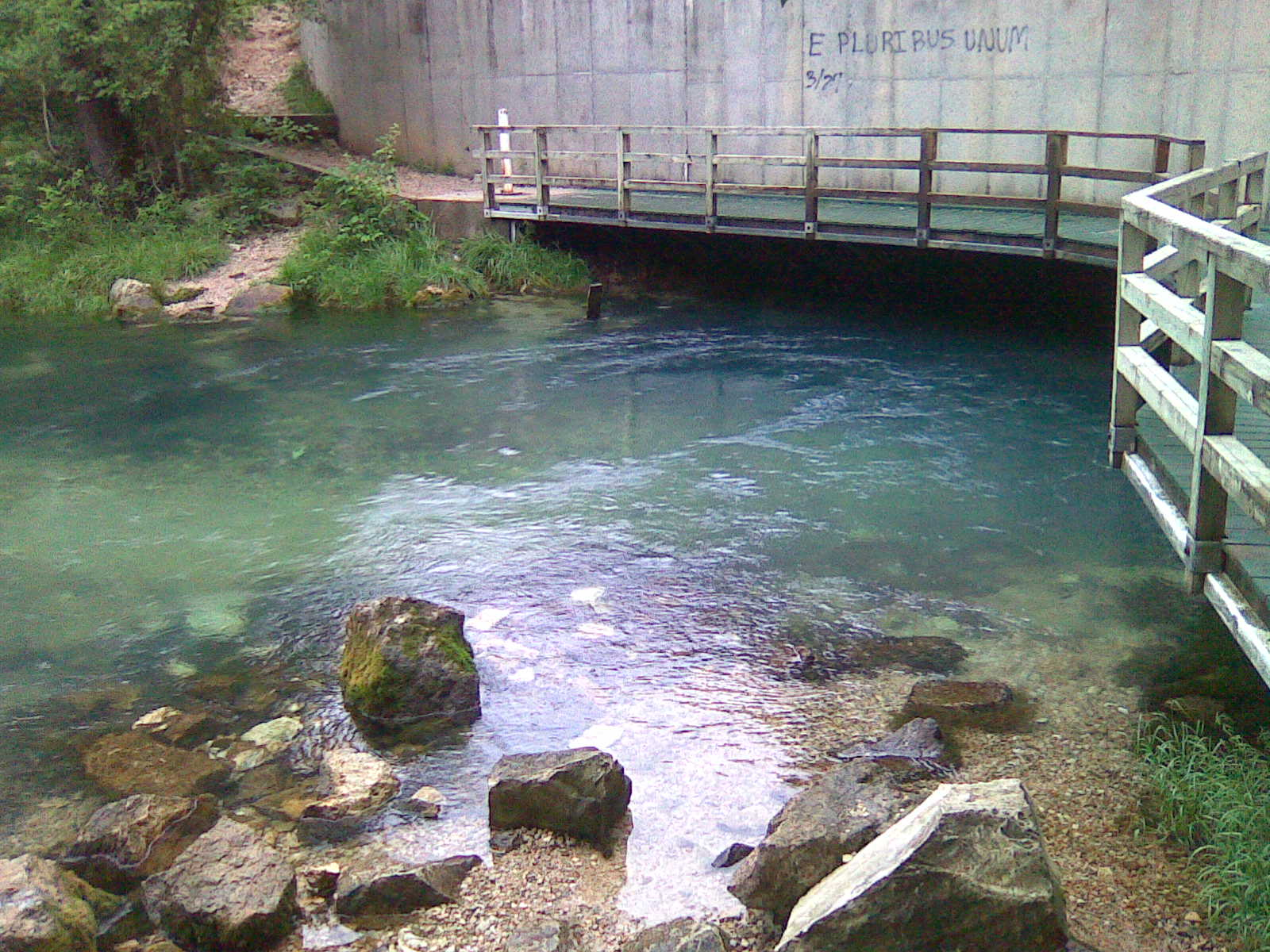
Roubidoux Spring outlet

== See also ==
- List of Ozark springs
- Mark Twain National Forest
- Karst spring
