= Festus R-VI School District =

School district in Missouri, U.S.

Festus R-IV School District

Location
- 1515 Mid-Meadow Lane, Festus, MO 63028 United States
- Coordinates: 38°13′21″N 90°24′56″W

District information
- Motto: Educating All Children to Meet Tomorrow's Challenges
- Established: 1949
- Superintendent: Dr. Nicki Ruess
- Schools: 4
- Budget: $30,568,000 (2017-18)
- NCES District ID: 2912030

Students and staff
- Students: 3093 (2019-20)
- Teachers: 189.20 FTE
- Staff: 53.30 FTE
- Student–teacher ratio: 16.35
- District mascot: Festus Tigers
- Colors: Black and Gold

Other information
- Website: District Website

Festus R-IV School District is the school district serving Festus, Missouri and adjacent portions of unincorporated Jefferson County, Missouri.

== History ==
The first school in Festus opened around 1880, with the first "regular" school opening in September 1882, for a six-month term. The first high school was started in 1901. After a student graduated from this two-year program, he or she could teach in the lower grades. The high school enrollment in October, 1913, was 47 students, with the 11th grade as the highest grade offered. By 1914–15, the school was now a four-year high school. There was some discussion in August 1916 about consolidating the high school with Crystal City, but it never progressed beyond a discussion. In March 1916, the Douglass High School for Black students, a one-story, two-room was destroyed by fire. Classes were then held in the black Masonic hall while a new school was constructed. On November 6, 1923, the Festus High School was destroyed by fire, including all furnishings, 1000 books, trophies, and equipment. There was city water supply at that time, which made it difficult to fight the blaze. The building and contents were valued at $60,000, but the district (Festus District #48) only had insurance for $16,500. The principal, R.E. Wood, risked his life to enter the building and retrieve the school records. A new elementary school (Eugene Field School, intended for grades 5–8) had just been completed and was made available to the high school students, while the lower grade students continued in the American Legion Hall. On September 19, 1924, the cornerstone was laid for a new high school building, on the same site as the building which had burned. It was completed in May 1925.

In 1939–40, the Douglass Cooperative four-year high school for black students opened with 65 students from Crystal City, Herculaneum, Festus, Bonne Terre, DeSoto, Potosi, Farmington, Frederickson and St. Marys.

In 1949, the district was reorganized as part of a series of reorganizations throughout the state of Missouri, and was renamed Festus R-VI School District. The district combined Festus with Hematite, Haverstick, Bailey, and portions of McNutt and Horine districts. It was one of the first four school districts in Jefferson County to be completely reorganized. In 1902, there had been 86 or 88 separate school districts in Jefferson County and the State of Missouri had 2, 539 districts, each with less than 20 students. By 1984, Festus R-VI was one of 11 districts in Jefferson County. In 1950, the district purchased a 56 acres tract of land west of Highway A for $15,500. A building tax levy was passed on April 30. 1951, for the purpose of constructing a new Douglass gymnasium, which was completed in 1954. On May 15, 1953, a special election to bond the district for $490,000 for new school buildings was passed by a vote of 1874 in favor to 62 against. In July 1953, the Public School Stadium was completed. In August 1953, a brick duplex was completed for use as a primary building. A new elementary school was planned, but the property purchased in 1950 was outside the city limits of Festus, and state law did not allow primary children to be housed in a building outside the city limits. In 1955, during the construction of the elementary school, a proposal was made to build a primary school adjacent to the elementary school, savings costs of demolition of the two old school buildings on Walnut and North Second, eliminate the need for kitchen equipment and an all-purpose room. These savings allowed for the building to have additional classrooms added. The elementary school was completed in 1956, and the area annexed by the city in 1958. On June 26, 1959, a bid was accepted for Four additional classrooms to be added to the elementary school.

On March 1, 1962, a bond issue for $705,000 was passed for the construction of a new high school. In 1967, a bid was accepted to add 8 classrooms top the lower (westernmost) elementary building. In 1967, the district began sending students to Jefferson College for Vocational School classes. In 1968, a bid was accepted to convert the kindergarten building into offices, as the kindergarten had moved to the Douglass gym in 1966. This building houses the current administration offices for the district. In March 1969, a special building levy was passed for the construction of a junior high. In 1972, the district was organized as follows: K through 5, elementary school; grades 6 and 7 in the middle school; grades 8 and 9 in the junior high and grades 10, 11, and 12 in the Senior High School.

In 2008, the school board proposed a bond for the construction of a new high school, but it failed twice.

In March 2018, the passing of Proposition 1, started the construction of several projects, including upgrades to the stadium (new entry and concessions) and the addition of a band room at the high school.

In April 2019, Proposition F passed for a 59-cent tax increase. One of the projects funded by the new tax increase, a new Performing Arts Center at the high school, started construction in 2020. Brockmiller Construction of Farmington was awarded a $12,3777,660 contract to build the center, scheduled to be completed fall of 2021.

== Finances ==
The assessed value of FSD is estimated to be $272 Million as of 2018 with a tax levy of $3.7453. The average teacher salary as of January 2018 is $54,026 while the average administrator makes nearly $100,000.

== Demographics ==
92% of the student body are Caucasian with 4% being African-American

== List of Schools ==
=== Elementary ===
- Festus Elementary
- Festus Intermediate

=== Middle ===
- Festus Middle School

=== High school ===
- Festus High School
