= Jefferson County Leader =

Local American newspaper

The Leader
- Website type: Local news
- Available in: English
- Headquarters: Festus, Missouri, {{{location_country}}}
- Key people: Peggy Scott (Publisher), Gary Castor (editor)
- Website: myleaderpaper.com
- Registration: Optional
- Launched: 1994
- Current status: Online

The Jefferson Leader is a local American newspaper founded in 1994 in Festus, Missouri. As part of The Leader Publications, The Jefferson County Leader provides local news for Jefferson County, Missouri and the greater Saint Louis region.
