= Twin City Christian Academy =

Private school in Missouri, United States

Location
- 723 Horine Road; Festus, Missouri 63028; United States; 38°13′42″N 90°24′22″W

Information
- Type: Private school
- Established: 1974; 52 years ago
- Staff: 16
- Grades: K–12
- Enrollment: 140
- Colors: Blue, white, and gold
- Sports: Basketball, Volleyball
- Nickname: Eagles
- Accreditation: AACS
- Tuition: $3,165
- Affiliation: Second Baptist Church
- Website: tccaeagles.com

Twin City Christian Academy (TCCA) is a Christian K-12 Private School located in Festus, Missouri. The institution was founded in 1974.

== History ==
Twin City Christian Academy was established in August 1974 by Gene Casey. Henry Roberts, a successful Christian educator, was brought from Georgia to help begin operations. Roberts became the first principal of the Academy. At its founding, Twin City was the first Baptist school in the state to offer K-12 education. Fifty-seven students composed the inaugural student body. By the end of the 1974-1975 school year, enrollment had swelled to seventy-eight children.

The influence of Second Baptist Church and its burgeoning ministries brought the new school to regional attention. Students began attending from Jefferson, St. Louis, and Ste. Genevieve Counties. Enrollment had exceeded 300 students by the spring of 1980.

== Academics ==
TCCA follows a lecture/demonstration/independent practice model of education, focusing on letting students develop critical thinking and problem solving skills thru discussion and assignments. The school requires a minimum of 174 days of school attendance and all students are required to take the Iowa Achievement Test to measure progress in different subjects. Every student is taught a biblical worldview and aided by teachers to develop their own biblical worldview. TCCA offers the Bob Jones Press and A Beka Curriculum to its students.

== Charity ==
In 2016 Twin City Christian Academy raised $30,000 for 10,000 boxed meals to be sent to people in need in St. Louis and in Haiti.
