= Festus High School =

Public school in Missouri, United States

Location
- 501 Westwind Drive; Festus, Missouri 63028; United States; 38°13′25″N 90°24′53″W

Information
- Type: Public high school
- Motto: Educating All Children to Meet Tomorrow's Challenges
- Established: 1901; 125 years ago
- School district: Festus R-VI School District
- Principal: Karl Shininger
- Staff: 56.31 (FTE)
- Grades: 9–12
- Enrollment: 1,023 (2023–24)
- Student to teacher ratio: 18.17
- Colors: Black and gold
- Athletics conference: Jefferson County Conference
- Nickname: Tigers
- Rival: Hillsboro High School
- Affiliation: MSHAA
- Website: festus.k12.mo.us

Festus High School is a public high school in Festus, Missouri. It is the only high school of the Festus R-VI School District. The school has 1,011 students. In 2018, the school earned a bronze medal for academic achievement due to a higher proficiency in reading and math in comparison to the state's average.

== Athletics ==
=== Girls' sports ===
Athletics at Festus began long before any organized program, probably during a recess period. Girls' basketball was popular since at least 1908. Girls' athletics were an uphill struggle for years, though it is unknown if this was due to in sufficient funds or a general feeling about girls in competitive sports. The Festus team was "The Jefferson County League" Champions in basketball in 1923–24, and won the 1929 county track and field meet. Competition was strong in the county during this time, and there large events and major achievements even when communications was mainly through the town's weekly newspaper. In 1936, and again in 1946, the girls softball team were the Jefferson County champs. At some point the girls track and field was discontinued.

Until 1945, Festus High School had no separate department for girls sports. At that time, all classes and any other extra-curricular activities were taught by men, and there were no competitive sports. A female Physical Education teacher was hired at this time, and an intra-mural program was started, beginning with volleyball and tumbling. Over time, more sports were added such as basketball, softball, archery, field hockey and gymnastics. Other schools also started hiring women for their physical education classes and games began between Festus, Crystal City and Herculaneum. Later a formal schedule was formed and eventually girls sports were included in the Activities Association.

The Festus girls teams were successful in several sports, particularly volleyball and basketball, in the 1970s. Gymnastics was discontinued after the 1980–81 season.

=== Boys' sports ===
As with girls sports, boys athletics began long before organized programs. There is little record of early successes, but in 1949, the football team was unscored upon until the last game of the season, and finished the season outscoring opponents 231–6. The team's quarterback was recognized as the leading scorer in Missouri with 131 points.

The boys baseball team was particularly successful in the late 1950s and early 1960s, playing six consecutive years without a conference loss, and winning seven conference championships.

=== Current sports ===
Boys Athletics

- Football
- Soccer
- Cross Country
- Basketball
- Wrestling
- Golf
- Track
- Wrestling
- Baseball
- Tennis

Girls Athletics

- Softball
- Volleyball
- Cross Country
- Dance
- Cheerleading
- Basketball
- Track
- Soccer
- Golf
- Tennis
- Track

== Student life ==
In 2017, a 10-man Rocketry club from Festus High won first place in an International Rocketry Challenge, where students from around the world compete to see who has the best rocket apparatus.

== Notable alumni ==
- Gordon S. Heddell (1961), Secret Service, Inspector General
- Kevin P. Engler (1977), politician
- Brian Henneman (1980), musician
- Ken Waller (1980), politician
- Brittany Borman (2008), Olympian
- Matt Stites (2008), MLB pitcher
