= Mack Gladden =

American football player (1909–1985)

Profile
- Positions: End, Tackle

Personal information
- Born: May 22, 1909; Turley, Missouri, U.S.
- Died: March 1985 (aged 75); Rolla, Missouri, U.S.
- Listed height: 6 ft 2 in (1.88 m)
- Listed weight: 295 lb (134 kg)

Career information
- College: Missouri

Career history
- St. Louis Gunners (1932–1934)
- Stats at Pro Football Reference

James M. "Mack" Gladden Jr. (May 22, 1909 – March 1985) was an American professional football player for the St. Louis Gunners.

== Early life ==
James M. "Mack" Gladden Jr. was born on May 22, 1909, to James Maston Gladden, in Turley, Missouri. He graduated from Houston High School in Houston, Missouri. He was a track and field star at Houston High and set a shot put record in 1927.

== Football career ==
Gladden played college football as an end for the University of Missouri from 1929 to 1931. In 1930, he was team captain of the track and field team at the University of Missouri. He was a two-time letterman for the school in 1929 and 1931. He played for the Gunners in 1932 and 1933, while the team still played independently of any league. He also played for the team in 1934, when they were short-lived members of the National Football League. He played for the Cleveland Rams, Pittsburgh Pirates, Cincinnati, St. Louis Gunners, Brooklyn Dodgers and Louisville Blues. In 1937, he returned to school to finish his physical education degree.

In 1937, Gladden joined coach Fritz Faurot as assistant coach of the University of Missouri Bulldogs. In 1938, Gidden coached track and was assistant football and basketball coach at Kirksville State Teachers College. He resigned the role in March 1938. In 1943, he was athletic director, coached basketball and track, and assistant football mentor at Rolla School of Mines in Rolla, Missouri. He coached the Panthers football team from 1944 to June 1, 1948, at Mountain Grove High School. He led the high school to three SCA championships. He then coached the Jays football, swimming and track teams at Jefferson City High School in Jefferson City. He coached for two years starting on August 23, 1948. On February 2, 1953, he succeeded Burr Van Nostrand as coach of Rolla High School.

== Personal life ==
Gladden married Mary Jones, daughter of Elmer Jones, of Kansas City on January 15, 1933. They had a son, J. M. III. He married Elizabeth Wilson, daughter of A. L. Wilson, of Louisville, Kentucky, on March 15, 1940.

Gladden died in Rolla in March 1985, aged 75.
