= KMRN =

Radio station in Cameron, Missouri

- Cameron, Missouri; United States
- Broadcast area: Northwest Missouri
- Frequency: 1360 kHz
- Branding: U.S. Country 99.3

Programming
- Language: English
- Format: Classic country
- Affiliations: Fox News Radio; Westwood One

Ownership
- Owner: Carter Media; (Carter Media Too LLC)
- Sister stations: KAAN; KAAN-FM; KKWK

History
- First air date: February 1971
- Call sign meaning: Cameron

Technical information
- Licensing authority: FCC
- Facility ID: 50744
- Class: D
- Power: 500 watts (day); 25 watts (night)
- Transmitter coordinates: 39°41′5″N 94°14′22.8″W
- Translator: 99.3 K257GU (Cameron)

Links
- Public license information: Public file; LMS
- Website: www.northwestmoinfo.com

KMRN (1360 AM, "U.S. Country 1360") is an American radio station licensed to serve the community of Cameron, Missouri. The station, founded in 1971, is owned by Connoisseur Media and the broadcast license is held by Carter Media Too LLC.

== Programming ==
KMRN broadcasts a full-service classic country music format branded as "U.S. Country 1360" to the Northwest Missouri area. In addition to country music from the 1960s through the early 1990s, KMRN airs news from Fox News Radio and MissouriNet, agricultural news from Brownfield, community bulletins and funeral notices, plus NCAA and high school football. Local church services are broadcast on Sunday mornings.

== History ==
=== Launch ===
In February 1971, Cameron Radio, Inc., received a broadcast license from the U.S. Federal Communications Commission (FCC) for a new broadcast radio station to serve Cameron, Missouri. It signed on with 500 watts of power on a frequency of 1360 kHz but authorized to broadcast during daylight hours only. The new station was assigned call sign "KMRN".

=== 1980s ===
In January 1981, KMRN applied to the FCC for authority to begin broadcasting at night as well as in the daytime. To prevent skywave interference, the station would transmit with only 25 watts of power from sunset to sunrise each day instead of the 500 watts in use during daylight hours. The FCC granted a new construction permit to make these changes on May 1, 1981. After construction and testing were completed in August 1981, the commission granted KMRN a new broadcast license to cover these changes on September 11, 1981.

After more than a decade on the air, Cameron Radio, Inc., made a deal to sell KMRN to Titan Corporation in July 1981. The FCC approved the deal on September 17, 1981. This proved short-lived as in July 1982, Titan Corporation applied to transfer the KMRN broadcast license to Cameron Radio, Inc. The FCC approved this move on July 26, 1982.

=== 1990s ===
In March 1994, Cameron Radio, Inc., contracted to sell KMRN to Osland Broadcasting Company. The new company was owned by Iowa native Norman A. Osland and his wife, Betty. The deal gained FCC approval on August 30, 1994, and the transaction was completed on October 8, 1994. In February 1997, as the Oslands were preparing to return to Iowa for family reasons, Osland Broadcasting Company applied to sell KMRN to NFO, Inc. The FCC approved this move on April 15, 1997, and completion of the transaction took place on May 5, 1997. Two years later, in May 1999, NFO, Inc., filed an application to transfer the KMRN license to Shepherd Group holding company KAAN, Inc. The FCC approved the move on July 13, 1999, and completion occurred on July 20, 1999.

=== 2000s ===
In February 2007, the KAAN, Inc, subsidiary of Shepherd Enterprises, Inc. (David L. Shepherd, president) reached an agreement with Dean Goodman's GoodRadio.TV, LLC. Goodman agreed to pay Shepherd $27,600,000 for 16 Missouri-based radio stations, including KAAN, KAAN-FM, Bethany and KMRN, KKWK, Cameron, controlled by KAAN, Inc., plus $100,000 for a non-competition agreement and $2,900,000 over five years as a consulting fee. The FCC approved the multi-station sale on May 9, 2007, and the deal was consummated on August 8, 2007.

One week later, as part of a complex internal reorganization of the GoodRadio.TV holding companies, an application was filed to transfer the licenses for KMRN and KKWK in Cameron, Missouri, and KAAN and KAAN-FM in Bethany, Missouri, to a new license holding company named Cameron/Bethany License Company, LLC. The FCC approved the transfer on September 10, 2007, and formal consummation took place on September 17, 2007.

In December 2013, GoodRadio.TV and its subsidiaries merged into Digity, LLC. Effective February 25, 2016, Digity and its 124 radio stations were acquired by Alpha Media for $264 million.

In May 2025, Connoisseur Media announced its intent to acquire Alpha Media. The FCC approved the sale on August 13, 2025, and the sale was consummated on September 4.

The station was sold to Carter Media in late 2025, and the sale closed February 19, 2026.
