= Slatten House =

Historic house in Missouri, United States

- U.S. National Register of Historic Places
- Location within Missouri Location within the United States
- Location: Route 4, near Bethany, Missouri
- Coordinates: 40°16′24″N 93°56′34″W
- Area: 1,000 acres (400 ha)
- Built: 1856
- Architectural style: Italianate
- NRHP reference No.: 84002553
- Added to NRHP: July 9, 1984

Slatten House, also known as Slatten Thousand Acres, is a historic home located near Bethany, Harrison County, Missouri. It was built in 1856, and is a two-story, five-bay, T-plan, Italianate style frame dwelling. A remodeling project added a belvedere atop the hipped roof during the latter part of the 19th century. The surrounding property includes free flowing springs that feed into cement water troughs, virgin timber and the remnants of virgin prairie, and archaeological remains.

It was listed on the National Register of Historic Places in 1984.
