= Old Stagecoach Stop =

- U.S. National Register of Historic Places
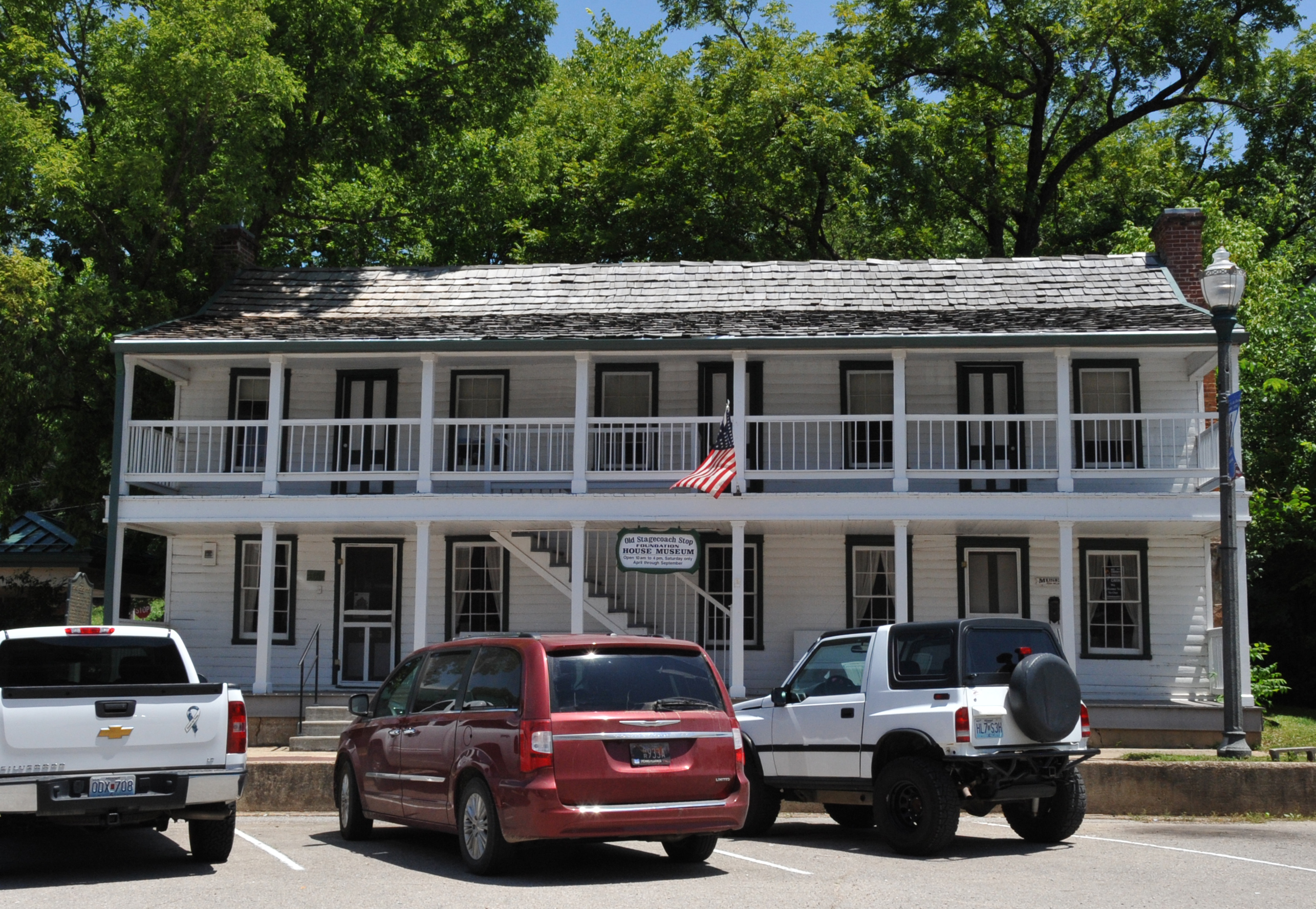
- Old Stagecoach Stop, January 2009

- Location within Missouri Location within the United States
- Location: Linn St., Courthouse Sq., Waynesville, Missouri
- Coordinates: 37°49′46″N 92°12′0″W
- Area: 0.1 acres (0.040 ha)
- Built: 1853
- NRHP reference No.: 80002391
- Added to NRHP: November 24, 1980

The Old Stagecoach Stop, previously known as the Tourist Hotel, Black Hotel, Johnson House, and originally the Waynesville House, is a historic hotel located in Waynesville, Pulaski County, Missouri, on the east side of the town square.

== History ==
It was built by William Walton McDonald in the early 1850s as a one-story, double-pen (also known as a dogtrot) log building. The dogtrot was soon enclosed, making it a three-room building The building served as a stagecoach stop and post office before the Civil War. The town was served by the South-Western Stage Company until the railroad traversed Pulaski County in 1869.

Waynesville was occupied by the 13th Missouri State Militia (MSM) in June 1862, under the command of Colonel Albert Sigel. The Union regiment was reorganized and renumbered as the 5th MSM in March 1863. Sigel built an earthen and wooden palisade fort on the hill overlooking the county seat town of Waynesville. Sigel commandeered McDonald's building for a post hospital. The Union soldiers occupied the town until the end of the war in 1865.

The building was purchased by Alexander Bryan in 1870, who added a second story and rear lean-to addition, transforming the small stagecoach stop/tavern into a ten-room hotel and named it the Waynesville House. The hotel was owned by a long succession owners during the next 110 years, housing soldiers during both world wars, the Korean War, and the beginning years of the Vietnam War, as well as tourists traveling Route 66.

The hotel deteriorated during the 1950s and 1960s. The owner did not make substantial improvements and the hostelry could not compete in amenities with the new motels being built in the area as a result of the nearby reopened and expanding Fort Leonard Wood. By the late-1960s, the old hotel was vacant.

Unoccupied, the building continued to deteriorate through the 1970s, its long and rich history unknown to the transient military population but valued by native residents. The old hotel, which had been known by several names during the past century, was rechristened the Old Stagecoach Stop and listed on the National Register of Historic Places in 1980.

However, National Register status did not rejuvenate the building. In December 1982, the City of Waynesville issued a condemnation notice to the owner for violation of a city ordinance prohibiting “hazardous buildings.” The oldest original building in the county was in danger of being demolished.

Local citizens formed a nonprofit organization in June 1983, the Old Stagecoach Stop Foundation, to purchase the condemned building and “to preserve, restore, protect and maintain the historic structure known as the ‘Old Stagecoach Stop’ in order to permit its educational value to be appreciated by future generations; to engage in educational and charitable activities related to the Old Stagecoach Stop."

The next nine years were a series of fundraisers for the Foundation, ranging from bake sales to concerts. The original note of $50,000 for the purchase of the building was paid off in the spring of 1992. Fundraising did not cease. Interior restoration and the acquisition of the remainder of the historic property, extending to Highway 17, required more than twice the funds of the original purchase price.

Today, the old hotel is a house museum. Each of the ten rooms is restored to a period or use reflecting the building's history. The museum is open April through September on Saturdays, 10:00 am to 4:00 pm. The Old Stagecoach Stop Foundation publishes an annual heritage newspaper about the county's history, the Old Settlers Gazette, available to readers and researchers on the Foundation's web site, http://oldstagecoachstop.org.
