= KTCM =

Radio station in Madison, Missouri

- Madison, Missouri; United States
- Broadcast area: Moberly, Missouri
- Frequency: 97.3 MHz
- Branding: Glory 97.3

Programming
- Format: Contemporary Christian music
- Affiliations: Salem Radio Network; Christian FM Media

Ownership
- Owner: Carter Media LLC; (Carter Media Too LLC)
- Sister stations: KRES; KWIX; KIRK

History
- First air date: June 17, 2010
- Call sign meaning: "Today's Christian Music"

Technical information
- Licensing authority: FCC
- Facility ID: 171017
- Class: C3
- ERP: 12,000 watts
- HAAT: 146 meters (479 ft)
- Transmitter coordinates: 39°26′45.5″N 92°10′11.9″W

Links
- Public license information: Public file; LMS
- Webcast: Listen live
- Website: centralmoinfo.com

KTCM (97.3 FM, "Glory 97.3") is a radio station licensed to serve Madison, Missouri, United States. The station, established in 2007, is owned by Carter Media with the broadcast license held by Carter Media Too LLC.

== Programming ==
KTCM broadcasts a contemporary Christian music format to the greater Moberly, Missouri, area. KTCM also carries the Dave Ramsey Show during the weekday afternoon hours. On weekends KTCM broadcasts the hour-long "Lighthouse Radio" of Macon First Baptist Church and the "Maximize Your Health Radio Show with Dr Rose" on Sundays.

== History ==
This station originally went on the air June 17, 2010.

On May 7, 2024, Alpha Media laid off all on-air talent for all their Missouri stations without warning, including KTCM and its sister stations.

In December 2013, GoodRadio.TV and its subsidiaries merged into Digity, LLC. Effective February 25, 2016, Digity and its 124 radio stations were acquired by Alpha Media for $264 million.

On May 7, 2024, Alpha Media laid off all on-air talent for all their Missouri stations without warning, including KIRK and its sister stations.

In May 2025, Connoisseur Media announced its intent to acquire Alpha Media.[12] The FCC approved the sale on August 13, 2025, and the sale was consummated on September 4.[13]

The station was sold to Carter Media in late 2025, and the sale closed February 19, 2026.
