= KJEL =

Radio station in Lebanon, Missouri

- Lebanon, Missouri; United States
- Frequency: 103.7 MHz
- Branding: New Country for the Ozarks

Programming
- Format: Country music
- Affiliations: Fox News Radio; St. Louis Cardinals Radio Network

Ownership
- Owner: Carter Media LLC; (Carter Media Too LLC)
- Sister stations: KJPW; KBNN; KOZQ-FM; KFBD-FM; KIIK

History
- First air date: October 20, 1973
- Former call signs: KJEL-FM (1972–1983); KIRK (1983–1996)

Technical information
- Licensing authority: FCC
- Facility ID: 51094
- Class: C0
- ERP: 100,000 watts
- HAAT: 300 meters (980 ft)
- Transmitter coordinates: 37°49′8.54″N 92°44′49.84″W

Links
- Public license information: Public file; LMS
- Webcast: Listen live
- Website: www.myozarksonline.com

KJEL (103.7 FM) is a radio station licensed to Lebanon, Missouri, United States, that broadcasts a country music format. Established in 1973, the station is owned by Connoisseur Media, through licensee Alpha Media Licensee LLC.

KJEL is a full service country station serving Lebanon and the surrounding area. It provides Fox News Radio at the beginning of the hour, then regional news around the Lebanon area. The station also carries the St. Louis Cardinals.

== History ==
KJEL-FM signed on October 20, 1973, under the ownership of Risner Broadcasting. At the outset, 60 percent of the station's programming was simulcast with KJEL (1080 AM, now KBNN on 750), which signed on the same day with middle of the road music and news programming. In 1980, the KJEL stations were sold to a group of businesspeople under the name KJEL, Inc. for $375,000. By 1981, KJEL-FM was only simulcasting 10 percent of its programming with the AM station, which had affiliated with the ABC Entertainment Network and changed to a country music format while retaining its news programming; the following year, the two stations began simulcasting full-time.

Ozark Broadcasting purchased the KJEL stations for $450,000 in 1983; this made the stations part of the Shepherd Group. Shepherd changed KJEL-FM's call letters to KIRK on October 3, 1983. By 1985, KIRK was programming a country music format separate from KJEL; in 1988, the station changed to an adult contemporary format. KIRK returned to country music in 1994, simulcasting 25 percent of its programming with KJEL; on December 1, 1996, the KJEL call letters (without the "-FM" suffix) returned to the station, after the AM station changed to talk radio station KBNN.

In March 2007, GoodRadio.TV LLC agreed to buy the Shepherd Group's stations, including KJEL, for $30.6 million. In 2013, GoodRadio.TV was merged into Digity, LLC (both companies were controlled by Dean Goodman) as part of Digity's acquisition of NextMedia. Effective February 25, 2016, Digity was acquired by Alpha Media for $264 million. Alpha Media merged with Connoisseur Media on September 4, 2025.
