= Roubidoux Creek =

Stream in Missouri, U.S.

Roubidoux Creek is a creek in Pulaski and Texas counties in Missouri, United States, that is a tributary of the Gasconade River.

== Description ==
The creek is located in the Ozarks of south central Missouri and is named after French-Canadian fur trader Joseph Robidoux. It is 57.4 miles (92.4 km) long. Due to its colder water temperatures, it is listed as a trout stream. Roubidoux Spring is a landmark that is nestled just south of downtown Waynesville. The creek cuts north through Fort Leonard Wood before crossing underneath Interstate 44 and into the city limits of Waynesville.

The former townsite of Roubidoux is located at the confluence of the east and west forks of the Roubidoux at 37°25′21″N 92°08′53″W.

The Roubidoux joins the Gasconade River just north of Waynesville, and the confluence can be seen from Missouri Route 17. The mouth of the creek is located at coordinates 37°51′02″N 92°12′52″W. It crosses under I-44 at 37°49′03″N 92°11′32″W.

== See also ==
- List of rivers in Missouri
