= Kiik (surname) =

Family name

Origin
- Language: Estonian
- Meaning: "swing"
- Region of origin: Estonia

Kiik is an Estonian language surname meaning "swing". As of 1 January 2021, 219 men and 223 women in Estonia have the surname Kiik. Kiik ranks 252nd for men and 286th for women in the distribution of surnames in the country. The surname Kiik is the most common in Jõgeva County, where 8.85 per 10,000 inhabitants of the county bear the surname.

Notable people bearing the surname Kiik include:

- Heino Kiik (1927–2013), writer
- Kaia Kiik (born 1973), artist and curator
- Kalle Kiik (born 1963), chess player
- Tanel Kiik (born 1989), politician
