= KIIK (AM) =

Radio station in Waynesville, Missouri

- Waynesville, Missouri; United States
- Frequency: 1270 kHz
- Branding: Talk 1270

Programming
- Language: English
- Format: Talk

Ownership
- Owner: Connoisseur Media; (Alpha Media Licensee LLC)
- Sister stations: KBNN; KFBD-FM; KJEL; KJPW; KOZQ-FM

History
- First air date: May 9, 1968
- Former call signs: KFBD (1968–1984); KOZQ (1984–2011)

Technical information
- Licensing authority: FCC
- Facility ID: 4260
- Class: D
- Power: 500 watts (day); 44 watts (night)
- Transmitter coordinates: 37°49′42.1″N 92°10′27.6″W

Links
- Public license information: Public file; LMS
- Website: www.myozarksonline.com

KIIK (1270 AM, "Talk 1270") is an American radio station licensed to serve the community of Waynesville, Missouri. The station, established in 1968, is owned by Connoisseur Media and the broadcast license is held by Alpha Media Licensee LLC.

It broadcasts a talk format branded as "Talk 1270".

The station was assigned the call sign "KIIK" by the Federal Communications Commission (FCC) on September 23, 2011.

On October 15, 2017, KIIK changed its format from sports to talk, branded as "Talk 1270".

Previous logo
