= Roubidoux, Missouri =

Extinct town in Missouri, U.S.

Coordinates: 37°25′21″N 92°08′53″W

Roubidoux is an extinct town in the Salem Plateau region of the Ozarks located in northwest Texas County, Missouri, United States. The GNIS classifies it as a populated place. The townsite is located at the confluence of the east and west forks of Roubidoux Creek. It is approximately 12 mi (19 km) northwest of Houston.

A post office called Roubidoux was established in 1850, and remained in operation until 1953. The community took its name from nearby Roubidoux Creek.
