= Festus, Missouri =

- City
- Festus in October 2026

- Location of Festus, Missouri
- Coordinates: 38°13′10″N 90°24′35″W
- Country: United States
- State: Missouri
- County: Jefferson
- Incorporated: 1887

Government
  - Type: Mayor–council government
  - Mayor: Sam Richards

Area
  - Total: 5.90 sq mi (15.29 km^{2})
  - Land: 5.90 sq mi (15.29 km^{2})
  - Water: 0 sq mi (0.00 km^{2})
- Elevation: 512 ft (156 m)

Population (2020)
  - Total: 12,706
  - Density: 2,151.8/sq mi (830.83/km^{2})
- Time zone: UTC-6 (Central (CST))
  - Summer (DST): UTC-5 (CDT)
- ZIP code: 63028
- Area code: 636
- FIPS code: 29-24094
- GNIS feature ID: 2394763
- Website: City website

Festus is a city situated in Jefferson County, Missouri, United States, and is also a suburb of St. Louis. As of the 2020 census, its population was 12,706.

== Geography ==
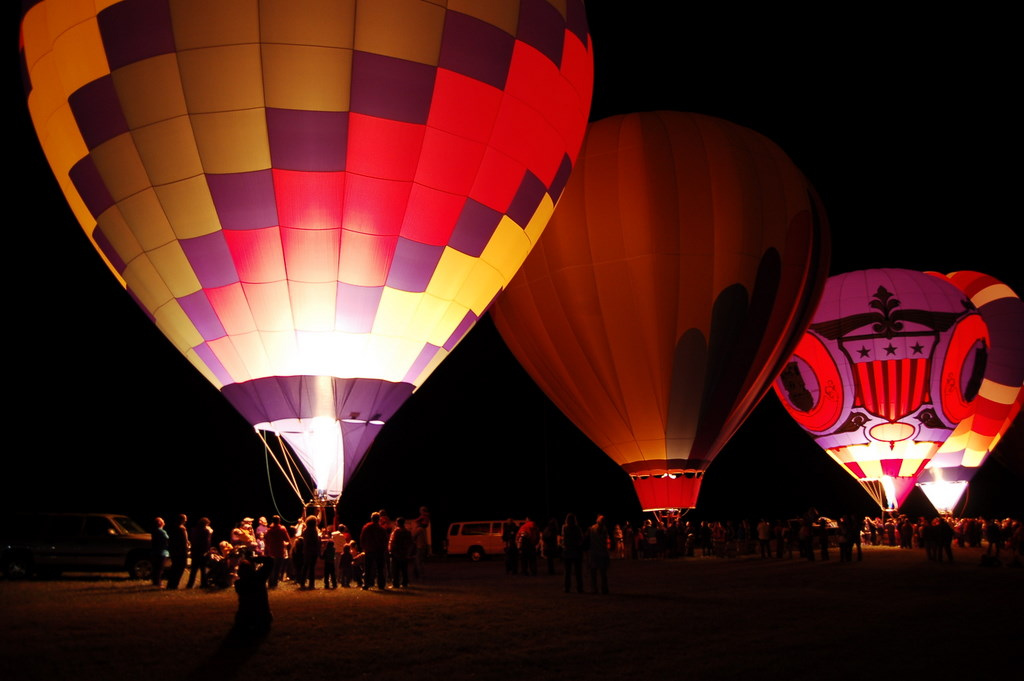
Festus Balloon Festival (2011)

Festus is situated just west of the Mississippi River. The city is served by I-55 and US routes 61 and 67.

According to the United States Census Bureau, the city has a total area of 5.71 square miles (14.79 km^{2}), all land.

=== Climate ===
Climate data for Festus, Missouri (1991–2020 normals, extremes 1934–present)
Month	Jan	Feb	Mar	Apr	May	Jun	Jul	Aug	Sep	Oct	Nov	Dec	Year
Record high °F (°C)	80 (27)	89 (32)	91 (33)	93 (34)	96 (36)	108 (42)	116 (47)	110 (43)	105 (41)	97 (36)	87 (31)	78 (26)	116 (47)
Mean maximum °F (°C)	66.0 (18.9)	72.0 (22.2)	79.4 (26.3)	85.6 (29.8)	89.3 (31.8)	93.7 (34.3)	97.3 (36.3)	97.1 (36.2)	92.6 (33.7)	86.1 (30.1)	76.0 (24.4)	67.3 (19.6)	99.1 (37.3)
Mean daily maximum °F (°C)	41.0 (5.0)	46.3 (7.9)	56.3 (13.5)	67.8 (19.9)	76.2 (24.6)	84.6 (29.2)	88.4 (31.3)	87.2 (30.7)	80.6 (27.0)	69.6 (20.9)	56.0 (13.3)	45.1 (7.3)	66.6 (19.2)
Daily mean °F (°C)	31.7 (−0.2)	35.8 (2.1)	44.9 (7.2)	55.8 (13.2)	65.0 (18.3)	73.6 (23.1)	77.8 (25.4)	76.3 (24.6)	68.9 (20.5)	57.6 (14.2)	45.5 (7.5)	35.8 (2.1)	55.7 (13.2)
Mean daily minimum °F (°C)	22.3 (−5.4)	25.3 (−3.7)	33.6 (0.9)	43.8 (6.6)	53.8 (12.1)	62.6 (17.0)	67.2 (19.6)	65.4 (18.6)	57.1 (13.9)	45.5 (7.5)	35.1 (1.7)	26.5 (−3.1)	44.9 (7.2)
Mean minimum °F (°C)	2.9 (−16.2)	7.2 (−13.8)	16.3 (−8.7)	28.8 (−1.8)	39.4 (4.1)	51.6 (10.9)	57.8 (14.3)	55.0 (12.8)	43.0 (6.1)	29.7 (−1.3)	19.7 (−6.8)	9.7 (−12.4)	−0.6 (−18.1)
Record low °F (°C)	−27 (−33)	−20 (−29)	−13 (−25)	17 (−8)	27 (−3)	37 (3)	43 (6)	40 (4)	28 (−2)	16 (−9)	−2 (−19)	−19 (−28)	−27 (−33)
Average precipitation inches (mm)	2.68 (68)	2.51 (64)	4.00 (102)	4.91 (125)	4.76 (121)	4.74 (120)	3.83 (97)	3.59 (91)	3.38 (86)	2.83 (72)	3.54 (90)	2.80 (71)	43.57 (1,107)
Average snowfall inches (cm)	2.1 (5.3)	2.7 (6.9)	1.1 (2.8)	0.2 (0.51)	0.0 (0.0)	0.0 (0.0)	0.0 (0.0)	0.0 (0.0)	0.0 (0.0)	0.0 (0.0)	0.6 (1.5)	2.5 (6.4)	9.2 (23)
Average precipitation days (≥ 0.01 in)	7.6	7.1	10.2	10.1	11.5	9.4	8.2	7.1	6.6	7.5	8.1	8.0	101.4
Average snowy days (≥ 0.1 in)	1.7	1.6	0.8	0.0	0.0	0.0	0.0	0.0	0.0	0.0	0.4	1.4	5.9
Source: NOAA

== History ==
Festus originated as an outgrowth of older neighbor Crystal City. It was established in 1878 by an individual named W. J. Adams, and was known as "Tanglefoot", supposedly because of situations involving drinkers from the local glass factory, who would drunkenly get their feet tangled in brush on their way home. The city was later called Limitville, but eventually "Festus" was chosen, purported to be in honor of St. Louis banker Festus J. Wade. Others claim the town's name was picked at random by a preacher who sat there, opened the Bible, and pointed to the name "Festus" in the Book of Acts. The City of Festus was incorporated in 1888 and grew to be one of the largest towns in the county. A post office called Festus has been in operation since 1883.

One of the founders of Festus was John Brierton, the great-granduncle of John Bruton, the Taoiseach (head of government) of the Republic of Ireland, who visited the city of Festus and his family's grave in De Soto, Missouri, in 1995.

On November 24, 2025, the Festus City Council voted unanimously for the city to annex a 240-acre area north of U.S. Route 67 and west of County Road CC. At the time, data center developer CRG was considering building a data center on the annexed land, though this proposal received backlash. In February 2026, the city hired accounting firm MarksNelson to negotiate terms with CRG. The city council approved CRG's data center project on March 30. Only two weeks later, during the municipal elections on April 7, Festus residents voted four city councilors out, and also started a petition to recall the city's mayor.

== Demographics ==
Historical population
Census	Pop.	Note	%±
1890	1,335		—
1900	1,250		−6.4%
1910	2,556		104.5%
1920	3,348		31.0%
1930	4,085		22.0%
1940	4,620		13.1%
1950	5,199		12.5%
1960	7,021		35.0%
1970	7,530		7.2%
1980	7,574		0.6%
1990	8,105		7.0%
2000	9,660		19.2%
2010	11,602		20.1%
2020	12,706		9.5%
U.S. Decennial Census

=== 2020 census ===
As of the 2020 census, Festus had a population of 12,706. The median age was 37.4 years. 25.3% of residents were under the age of 18 and 16.6% of residents were 65 years of age or older. For every 100 females there were 92.0 males, and for every 100 females age 18 and over there were 88.4 males age 18 and over.

99.4% of residents lived in urban areas, while 0.6% lived in rural areas.

There were 5,101 households in Festus, including 3,229 families. Of all households, 34.1% had children under the age of 18 living in them, 42.5% were married-couple households, 17.3% were households with a male householder and no spouse or partner present, and 31.6% were households with a female householder and no spouse or partner present. About 29.3% of all households were made up of individuals and 13.8% had someone living alone who was 65 years of age or older.

There were 5,361 housing units, of which 4.8% were vacant. The homeowner vacancy rate was 0.9% and the rental vacancy rate was 4.8%.

Racial composition as of the 2020 census
Race	Number	Percent
White	11,180	88.0%
Black or African American	404	3.2%
American Indian and Alaska Native	41	0.3%
Asian	81	0.6%
Native Hawaiian and Other Pacific Islander	6	0.0%
Some other race	85	0.7%
Two or more races	909	7.2%
Hispanic or Latino (of any race)	313	2.5%

=== Income and poverty ===
The 2016–2020 5-year American Community Survey estimates show that the median household income was $59,041 (with a margin of error of +/- $5,486) and the median family income was $66,773 (+/- $11,558). Males had a median income of $37,913 (+/- $3,471) versus $30,682 (+/- $4,826) for females. The median income for those above 16 years old was $33,353 (+/- $5,734). Approximately, 6.0% of families and 12.2% of the population were below the poverty line, including 16.9% of those under the age of 18 and 5.4% of those ages 65 or over.

=== 2010 census ===
At the 2010 census there were 11,602 individuals, 4,636 households, and 3,036 families living in the city. The population density was 2,031.9 inhabitants per square mile (784.5/km^{2}). There were 4,972 housing units at an average density of 870.8 per square mile (336.2/km^{2}). The racial makeup of the city was 93.5% White, 3.4% African American, 0.2% Native American, 0.8% Asian, 0.2% from other races, and 1.9% from two or more races. Hispanic or Latino of any race were 1.2%.

Of the 4,636 households 37.0% had children under the age of 18 living with them, 46.2% were married couples living together, 14.5% had a female householder with no husband present, 4.8% had a male householder with no wife present, and 34.5% were non-families. 28.7% of households were one person and 12.1% were one person aged 65 or older. The average household size was 2.47 and the average family size was 3.04.

The median age was 34.9 years. 26.8% of residents were under the age of 18; 8.1% were between the ages of 18 and 24; 27.7% were from 25 to 44; 23.5% were from 45 to 64; and 13.9% were 65 or older. The gender makeup of the city was 48.3% male and 51.7% female.

=== 2000 census ===
At the 2000 census there were 9,660 individuals, 1,000 households, and 2,606 families living in the city. The population density was 2,020.2 inhabitants per square mile (780.0/km^{2}). There were 4,040 housing units at an average density of 844.9 per square mile (326.2/km^{2}). The racial makeup of the city was 93.66% White, 3.93% African American, 0.30% Native American, 0.72% Asian, 0.04% Pacific Islander, 0.37% from other races, and 0.96% from two or more races. Hispanic or Latino of any race were 1.04%.

Of the 3,861 households 33.3% had children under the age of 18 living with them, 49.7% were married couples living together, 13.5% had a female householder with no husband present, and 32.5% were non-families. 28.0% of households were one person and 12.7% were one person aged 65 or older. The average household size was 2.45 and the average family size was 2.97.

The age distribution was 5.8% under the age of 18, 9.5% from 18 to 24, 28.3% from 25 to 44, 20.5% from 45 to 64, and 15.9% 65 or older. The median age was 36 years. For every 100 females, there were 88.9 males. For every 100 females age 18 and over, there were 84.6 males.

Males had a median income of $36,159 versus $25,108 for females. The per capita income for the city was $19,035. About 7.0% of families and 10.2% of the population were below the poverty line, including 13.6% of those under age 18 and 6.1% of those age 65 or over.

=== Religion ===
Festus is home to a wide variety of religions, including Christians, Muslims, Pagans and Jews. Atheist and non-believer individuals make up 63% of the population, while God believers make up the remaining 37%, the vast majority being Christian. 12.9% are Baptist, 14.2% are Catholic and 2.8% are Lutheran.

== Education ==
Festus R-VI School District operates Festus High School. Our Lady Catholic School (K-8) and Twin City Christian Academy (K-12) are private institutions in the city.

Festus has a lending library, the Festus Public Library.

== News and media ==
- Jefferson County Leader
- KJFF (1400 AM)

== Transportation ==
- Interstate 55
- U.S. Route 61
- U.S. Route 67
- Festus Memorial Airport (Defunct)

== In popular culture ==
Festus is the home of the alt-country band The Bottle Rockets.

The town is mentioned in the 1974 country song "(We're Not) The Jet Set," in which George Jones and Tammy Wynette sing about road tripping around the Midwestern and Southern part of the United States in a Chevrolet while falling in love.

The Drunken Peasants podcast had a running gag in the form of a feud with Brett Keane, a YouTuber and resident of Festus. The feud involved satirizing and mocking Brett Keane, usually by referencing his speech patterns (such as his incessant use of the words "Individual", "Situation", and "Particular" and his frequent misquoting of common phrases), as well as creating many false personas under the guise of residents or passersby of Festus calling into the show through the "Pokémon Hotline" (ostensibly created for viewers to call in with Pokémon Go tips, though in actuality it was merely used as a vessel for call-in gags at the expense of Brett Keane) and recounting fictitious, humorous encounters with Brett, often involving exaggerated claims of heroism, allegations of Zoophilia, and other jokes at his expense.

== Notable animals ==
- Travis (chimpanzee), animal actor famous for mauling a woman.

== See also ==
- Music of Missouri
