= Waynesville, Missouri =

- City
- City of Waynesville
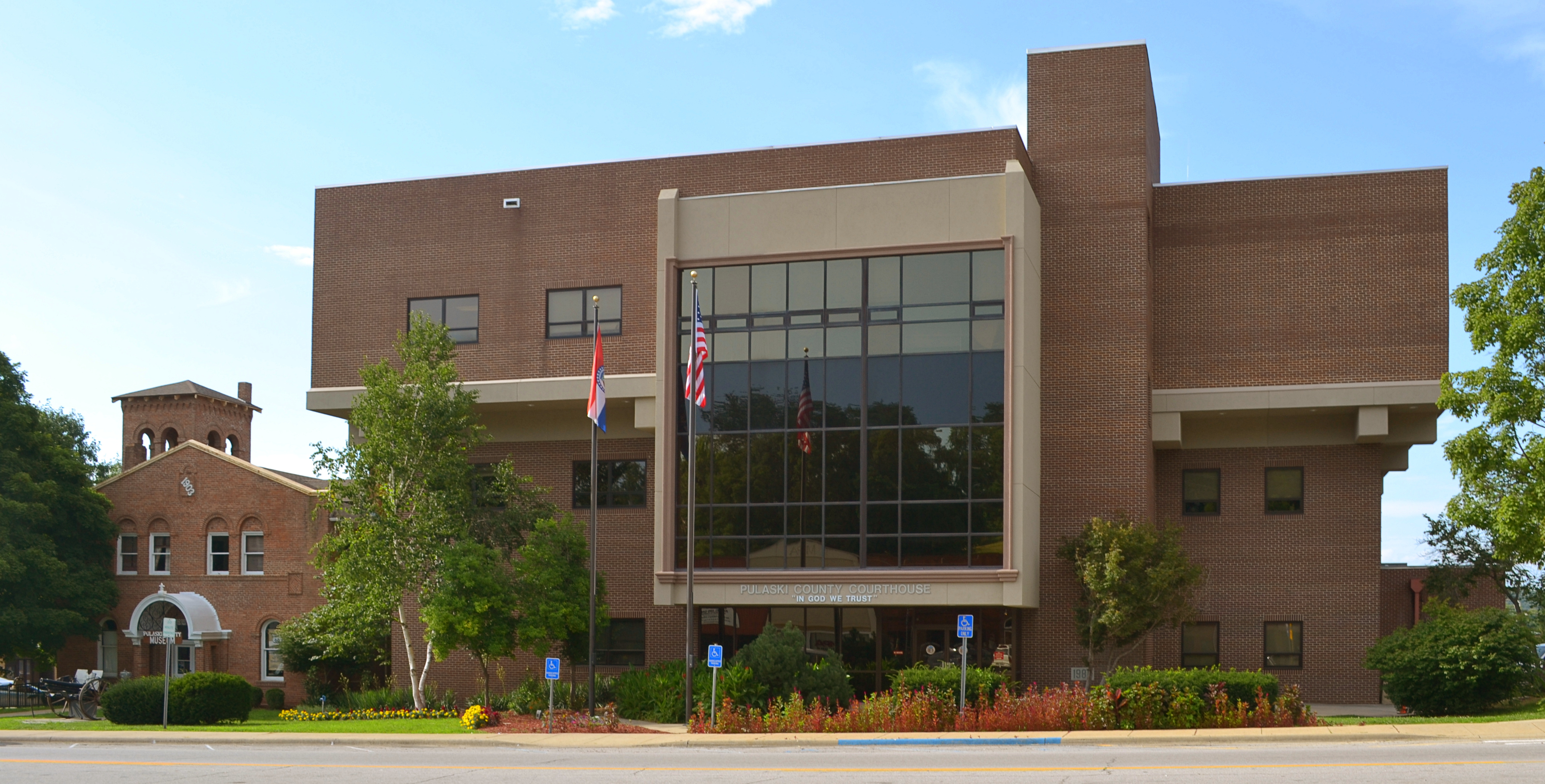
- Pulaski County Courthouse, Waynesville

- Location of Waynesville, Missouri
- Coordinates: 37°49′12″N 92°13′13″W
- Country: United States
- State: Missouri
- County: Pulaski

Area
  - Total: 7.18 sq mi (18.60 km^{2})
  - Land: 7.15 sq mi (18.53 km^{2})
  - Water: 0.027 sq mi (0.07 km^{2})
- Elevation: 873 ft (266 m)

Population (2020)
  - Total: 5,406
  - Density: 755.7/sq mi (291.79/km^{2})
- Time zone: UTC-6 (Central (CST))
  - Summer (DST): UTC-5 (CDT)
- ZIP code: 65583
- Area code: 573
- FIPS code: 29-77992
- GNIS feature ID: 2397234
- Website: waynesvillemo.org

Waynesville is a city in and the county seat of Pulaski County, Missouri, United States. Its population was 5,406 at the 2020 census. Located in the Missouri Ozarks, it was once served by Route 66.

== History ==
Waynesville was platted in 1839 and the city was named for Anthony Wayne.

The post office in Waynesville has been in operation since 1834. During the Civil War, units of the 5th Missouri State Militia were sometimes garrisoned at Waynesville.

== Geography ==
Waynesville is located on Roubidoux Creek, approximately 2 miles (3.2 km) south of the Gasconade River. The northern boundary of Fort Leonard Wood, a United States Army fort, is about 2 miles (3.2 km) to the south. The Roubidoux Spring, the 15th largest in the state, is located in the city limits. The Roubidoux Spring was a stop on the Trail of Tears.

According to the United States Census Bureau, the city has a total area of 6.45 square miles (16.71 km^{2}), of which 6.42 square miles (16.63 km^{2}) is land and 0.03 square miles (0.08 km^{2}) is water.

== Demographics ==
Historical population
Census	Pop.	Note	%±
1910	257		—
1920	293		14.0%
1930	392		33.8%
1940	468		19.4%
1950	1,010		115.8%
1960	2,377		135.3%
1970	3,375		42.0%
1980	2,879		−14.7%
1990	3,207		11.4%
2000	3,507		9.4%
2010	4,830		37.7%
2020	5,406		11.9%
U.S. Decennial Census

=== 2020 census ===
As of the 2020 census, Waynesville had a population of 5,406. The median age was 33.7 years. 25.1% of residents were under the age of 18 and 12.2% of residents were 65 years of age or older. For every 100 females there were 89.0 males, and for every 100 females age 18 and over there were 86.8 males age 18 and over.

86.8% of residents lived in urban areas, while 13.2% lived in rural areas.

There were 2,170 households in Waynesville, of which 32.6% had children under the age of 18 living in them. Of all households, 43.3% were married-couple households, 19.1% were households with a male householder and no spouse or partner present, and 30.7% were households with a female householder and no spouse or partner present. About 32.6% of all households were made up of individuals and 8.8% had someone living alone who was 65 years of age or older.

There were 2,476 housing units, of which 12.4% were vacant. The homeowner vacancy rate was 4.1% and the rental vacancy rate was 11.2%.

Racial composition as of the 2020 census
Race	Number	Percent
White	3,837	71.0%
Black or African American	585	10.8%
American Indian and Alaska Native	37	0.7%
Asian	152	2.8%
Native Hawaiian and Other Pacific Islander	29	0.5%
Some other race	132	2.4%
Two or more races	634	11.7%
Hispanic or Latino (of any race)	490	9.1%

=== 2010 census ===
At the 2010 census, there were 4,830 people, 1,894 households, and 1,252 families residing in the city. The population density was 752.3 per square mile (290.5/km^{2}). There were 2,088 housing units at an average density of 325.2 per square mile (125.6/km^{2}). The racial make-up of the city was 73.6% White, 12.4% African American, 1.1% Native American, 3.4% Asian, 0.5% Pacific Islander, 2.5% from other races and 6.5% from two or more races. Hispanic or Latino of any race were 8.1% of the population.

There were 1,894 households, of which 37.8% had children under the age of 18 living with them, 49.3% were married couples living together, 13.3% had a female householder with no husband present, 3.5% had a male householder with no wife present and 33.9% were non-families. 28.9% of all households were made up of individuals, and 8.2% had someone living alone who was 65 years of age or older. The average household size was 2.48 and the average family size was 3.04.

The median age was 32.6 years. 28% of residents were under the age of 18, 8.8% were between the ages of 18 and 24;, 30.6% were from 25 to 44, 21.2% were from 45 to 64 and 11.2% were 65 years of age or older. The gender make-up of the city was 47.1% male and 52.9% female.

=== 2000 census ===
At the 2000 census, there were 3,507 people, 1,428 households and 922 families residing in the city. The population density was 563.3 per square mile (217.5/km^{2}). There were 1,591 housing units at an average density of 255.6 per square mile (98.7/km^{2}). The racial make-up of the city was 79.70% White, 10.98% African American, 0.94% Native American, 2.88% Asian, 0.11% Pacific Islander, 1.43% from other races and 3.96% from two or more races. Hispanic or Latino of any race were 3.11% of the population.

There were 1,428 households, of which 32.5% had children under the age of 18 living with them, 49.6% were married couples living together, 11.6% had a female householder with no husband present, and 35.4% were non-families. 31.3% of all households were made up of individuals and 10.5% had someone living alone who was 65 years of age or older. The average household size was 2.34 and the average family size was 2.93. Of the population, 27.3% were under the age of 18, 6.4% from 18 to 24, 29.3% from 25 to 44, 23.4% from 45 to 64, and 13.6% who were 65 years of age or older. The median age was 38 years. For every 100 females, there were 89.4 males. For every 100 females age 18 and over, there were 86.0 males.

The median household income was $41,250 and the median family income was $46,205. Males had a median income of $31,435 and females $23,640. The per capita income was $19,117. About 9.5% of families and 11.3% of the population were below the poverty line, including 16.9% of those under age 18 and 17.5% of those age 65 or over.

== Climate ==
Waynesville experiences a humid subtropical climate (Köppen climate classification Cfa), as does much of southern Missouri.

Climate data for Waynesville 2 W, Missouri (1991–2020 normals, extremes 1941–present)
Month	Jan	Feb	Mar	Apr	May	Jun	Jul	Aug	Sep	Oct	Nov	Dec	Year
Record high °F (°C)	79 (26)	85 (29)	88 (31)	99 (37)	95 (35)	104 (40)	115 (46)	107 (42)	104 (40)	97 (36)	87 (31)	79 (26)	115 (46)
Mean daily maximum °F (°C)	44.1 (6.7)	49.2 (9.6)	58.9 (14.9)	69.3 (20.7)	76.8 (24.9)	84.5 (29.2)	89.1 (31.7)	88.6 (31.4)	81.3 (27.4)	71.1 (21.7)	58.3 (14.6)	47.7 (8.7)	68.2 (20.1)
Daily mean °F (°C)	33.2 (0.7)	37.4 (3.0)	46.6 (8.1)	56.8 (13.8)	65.4 (18.6)	73.7 (23.2)	78.0 (25.6)	76.8 (24.9)	68.8 (20.4)	57.9 (14.4)	46.5 (8.1)	37.1 (2.8)	56.5 (13.6)
Mean daily minimum °F (°C)	22.4 (−5.3)	25.6 (−3.6)	34.3 (1.3)	44.3 (6.8)	53.9 (12.2)	63.0 (17.2)	66.9 (19.4)	65.1 (18.4)	56.4 (13.6)	44.6 (7.0)	34.7 (1.5)	26.6 (−3.0)	44.8 (7.1)
Record low °F (°C)	−23 (−31)	−23 (−31)	−14 (−26)	13 (−11)	24 (−4)	35 (2)	42 (6)	36 (2)	24 (−4)	11 (−12)	−3 (−19)	−25 (−32)	−25 (−32)
Average precipitation inches (mm)	2.69 (68)	2.72 (69)	4.08 (104)	4.81 (122)	5.18 (132)	4.67 (119)	4.30 (109)	4.61 (117)	4.18 (106)	3.56 (90)	3.76 (96)	2.90 (74)	47.46 (1,205)
Average snowfall inches (cm)	4.8 (12)	2.9 (7.4)	0.9 (2.3)	0.0 (0.0)	0.0 (0.0)	0.0 (0.0)	0.0 (0.0)	0.0 (0.0)	0.0 (0.0)	0.0 (0.0)	0.6 (1.5)	1.0 (2.5)	10.2 (26)
Average precipitation days (≥ 0.01 in)	6.8	6.5	8.7	9.4	10.7	8.8	7.6	7.1	6.5	7.1	7.5	6.3	93.0
Average snowy days (≥ 0.1 in)	1.4	1.0	0.3	0.1	0.0	0.0	0.0	0.0	0.0	0.0	0.3	0.7	3.8
Source: NOAA

== Government ==
Waynesville is classified a 3rd Class City with an elected mayor and city council. Sean A. Wilson holds the office of mayor. The city council members are Rob Rice and Bill Farnham (Ward 1), Donald Hayden and Ryan Hicks (Ward 2), Ryan Bland and Trudy Dils (Ward 3), and Amanda Koren and Robert Hyatt (Ward 4). John Doyle is the city administrator and Michele Brown is the city clerk.

== Education ==
Almost all of Waynesville is in the Waynesville R-VI School District. A small portion is in Laquey R-V School District.

Waynesville Schools include Williams Early Childhood Development Center (Pre-K - Kindergarten), Wood Elementary (K-5), Pick Elementary (K-5), East Elementary (K-5), Freedom Elementary (K-5), Waynesville Sixth Grade Center (6th), Waynesville Middle School (7 & 8), and Waynesville High School (9–12). Waynesville has a public library, a branch of the Pulaski County Library District.

== Registered historic places ==
- Old Stagecoach Stop (also known as "Black Hotel" or "Pulaski House")
- Pulaski County Courthouse

== Attractions ==
The city of Waynesville as a rock sculpture and painted in a shape of a frog known as "frog rock" carved and sculptuped in 1990s. It's also named "W.H. Croaker" with W.H standing for Waynesville Hill.

== Transportation ==
Waynesville-St. Robert Regional Airport provides the community with air service. Although it is on Fort Leonard Wood, it is jointly run by the cities of Waynesville and St. Robert. However the passenger terminal is operated under the control of the United States Army. The airport is available for civilian use by private pilots and scheduled commercial passenger service.

The major east–west route is Interstate 44; before that, the main highway was U.S. Route 66, which still exists as a scenic route through the area and passes through Devil's Elbow, St. Robert, Waynesville, Buckhorn, and Hazelgreen. Names for U.S. Route 66 vary. At different places, it is called Teardrop Road, Highway Z, Old Route 66, Historic Route 66, and Highway 17. State-posted signs mark most of the alignment of the road.

The major north–south routes near Waynesville are:

- Route 17 which crosses Interstate 44 at exit 153 at Buckhorn, runs east through Waynesville, turns north to Crocker and going to Iberia. South of Interstate 44, Highway 17 hugs the western edge of Fort Leonard Wood, passes near Laquey, and circles south of the post until it leaves the county and joins Highway 32 in Roby.
- Highway T which runs north from Highway 17 at Waynesville to Swedeborg, where it meets and ends at Highway 133 about halfway between Richland and Crocker.

Major attractions along U.S. Route 66 include the Old Stagecoach Stop in downtown Waynesville, which is now a museum but began as a tavern and boarding house and is the oldest standing structure in the county. It was used as a Civil War hospital for Union troops who were garrisoned above the city in Fort Wayne, which was demolished after the war. The Old Courthouse Museum in downtown Waynesville is near the Old Stagecoach Stop. The City Of Waynesville does not provide any public transportation like buses or shuttles.

== Media ==
KFBD-FM and its AM sister station, KJPW, are the dominant news radio providers in the Pulaski County area, which includes Fort Leonard Wood, Waynesville and St. Robert. These stations compete with the only other station broadcasting from Pulaski County, KFLW Radio, previously owned by the Lebanon Daily Record and working locally from the St. Robert offices of the Pulaski County Mirror weekly newspaper.

The Pulaski County Daily News online newspaper is privately owned by a Waynesville resident. The Pulaski County Insider is run and maintained by a businessman from St. Robert and hosted by a Potosi resident. The county's weekly paper, the Dixon Pilot, does not routinely cover Waynesville.

Pulaski County historically had one daily and three weekly print newspapers, as well as an online internet daily newspaper. All but the weekly Dixon Pilot and the online Pulaski County Daily News are now closed. The county also has an internet discussion site, the Pulaski County Insider. The Daily Guide, commonly known as the Waynesville Daily Guide, but based in St. Robert and serving the entire county, closed in September 2018. It was owned by GateHouse Media and was the central printing plant for three other GateHouse newspapers in nearby counties, the daily Camden Lake Sun Leader and Rolla Daily News as well as the weekly St. James Leader-Journal. The Rolla Daily News and the St. James weekly have since closed as well.

The content of the now-closed weekly Fort Leonard Wood Guidon was previously produced under the auspices of Army Public Affairs at Fort Leonard Wood but printed under contract by the Springfield News-Leader, a Gannett-owned newspaper which produced and sold advertisements in the Fort Leonard Wood Guidon. The military contract to produce the Guidon was held by the Lebanon Daily Record until the end of 2002, and before the Lebanon Daily Record had been held by the Waynesville Daily Guide for many years. The weekly Pulaski County Mirror closed in February 2017 and had been owned by the Lebanon Daily Record, a family owned newspaper in an adjoining county. The paper is a merger of the Richland Mirror and Pulaski County Democrat in St. Robert, which were separate weekly papers owned by the Lebanon Daily Record until the owner merged them in 2009.
