= KREI =

Radio station in Farmington, Missouri

Coordinates: 37°47′32.2″N 90°24′36.4″W

- Farmington, Missouri; United States
- Frequency: 800 kHz
- Branding: Podcast Radio Missouri

Programming
- Format: Podcast

Ownership
- Owner: Connoisseur Media; (Alpha Media Licensee LLC)

History
- First air date: 1948

Technical information
- Licensing authority: FCC
- Facility ID: 35531
- Class: D
- Power: 1,000 watts day; 150 watts night

Links
- Public license information: Public file; LMS
- Webcast: Listen live
- Website: www.mymoinfo.com/stations/am-800-krei/

KREI (800 AM) is a radio station licensed to Farmington, Missouri, United States. The station airs a podcast format, and is owned by Connoisseur Media, through licensee Alpha Media Licensee LLC.

The station introduced its current format on May 27, 2024.
