= KJFF =

Radio station in Festus, Missouri

- Festus, Missouri; United States
- Broadcast area: Jefferson County, Missouri
- Frequency: 1400 kHz
- Branding: Straight Talk 1400 AM; AM 1400 K-Jeff

Programming
- Format: News-talk
- Affiliations: ABC News Radio; Premiere Networks

Ownership
- Owner: Connoisseur Media; (Alpha Media Licensee LLC)

History
- First air date: May 10, 1951; 74 years ago
- Call sign meaning: Jefferson County

Technical information
- Licensing authority: FCC
- Facility ID: 35532
- Class: C
- Power: 1,000 watts unlimited
- Transmitter coordinates: 38°13′56.2″N 90°23′50.4″W

Links
- Public license information: Public file; LMS
- Webcast: Listen live
- Website: www.mymoinfo.com/stations/kjff

KJFF (1400 AM) is a commercial radio station in Festus, Missouri, serving Jefferson County (hence the call sign). It airs a news-talk radio format, and is owned by Connoisseur Media, through licensee Alpha Media Licensee LLC. It is a network affiliate of ABC News Radio and also carries programs from Premiere Networks. In the fall, it airs local high school football games.

KJFF is powered at 1,000 watts as a Class C radio station.

== History ==
KJFF signed on the air on May 19, 1951. It has always had the KJFF call sign.
