= Bethany, Missouri =

- City
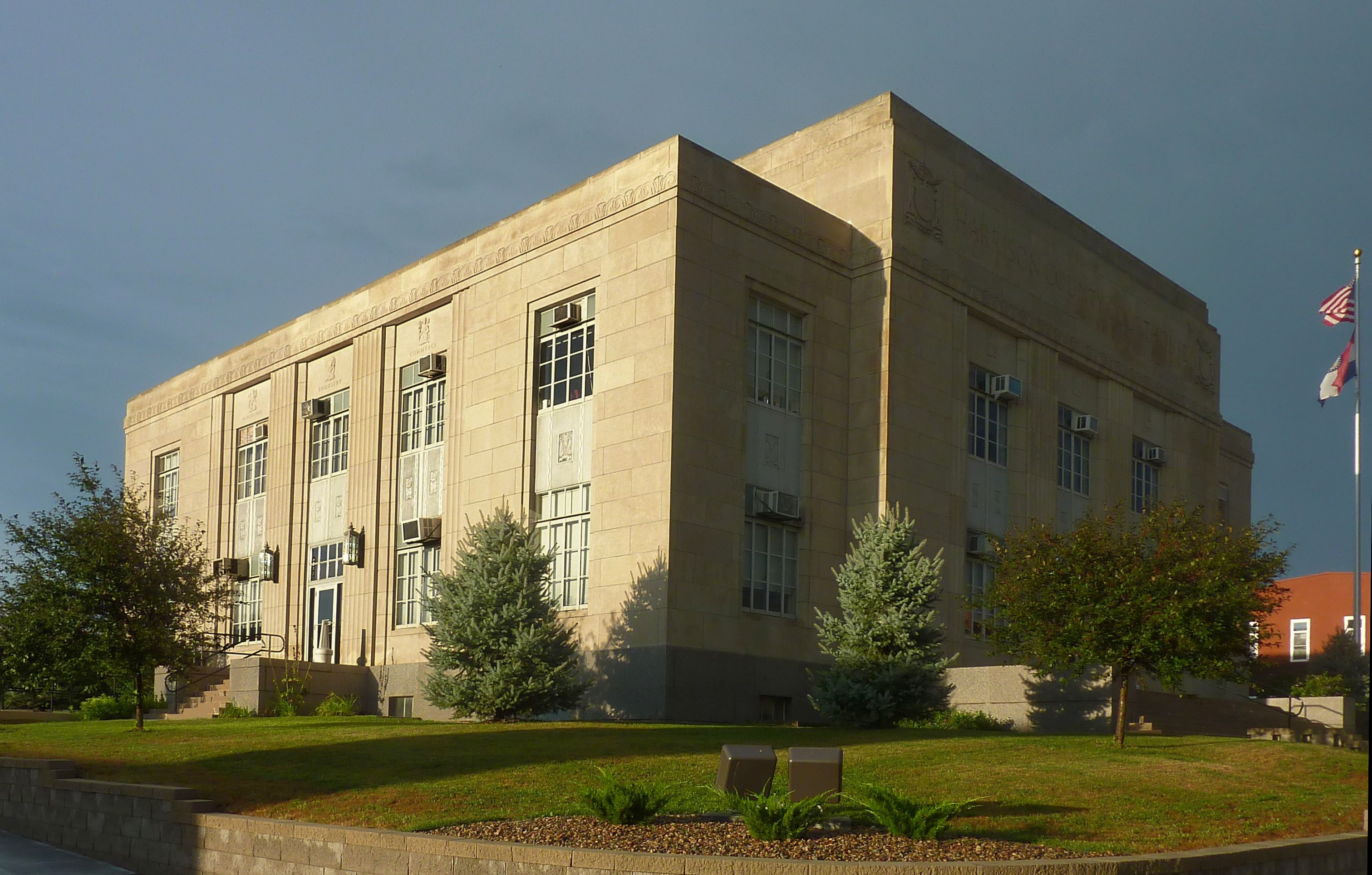
- The Harrison County Courthouse is in downtown Bethany.

- Location of Bethany, Missouri
- Coordinates: 40°16′06″N 94°01′42″W
- Country: United States
- State: Missouri
- County: Harrison
- Bethany: June 27, 1845; 181 years ago

Area
  - Total: 4.48 sq mi (11.60 km^{2})
  - Land: 4.44 sq mi (11.50 km^{2})
  - Water: 0.039 sq mi (0.10 km^{2})
- Elevation: 892 ft (272 m)

Population (2020)
  - Total: 2,915
  - Density: 656.4/sq mi (253.42/km^{2})
- Time zone: UTC-6 (Central (CST))
  - Summer (DST): UTC-5 (CDT)
- ZIP code: 64424
- Area code: 660
- FIPS code: 29-05068
- GNIS feature ID: 2394155
- Website: bethanymo.com

Bethany is a city in, and the county seat of, Harrison County, Missouri, approximately midway between Kansas City and Des Moines on Interstate 35. The population was 2,915 at the 2020 census.

== History ==
European settlement of Harrison County began c. 1838, although the land was not surveyed and opened for entry until 1842. The county is named after Albert C. Harrison, a 19th-century Missouri political figure. Many of the early settlers to the area homesteaded along Sugar Creek and in the Bethany area. Three commissioners deliberated for several days to determine a site for the county seat, and voted to site it in the southern part of the county. The original name of the community was Dallas.

In June 1845, John S. Allen was appointed to survey the town into lots and offer the same for sale. The plat, covering 19 acres (7.7 hectare), was completed on June 27, 1845.

The first home constructed in the community was built by John S. Allen. Although built as a residence, it was primarily used to store the first stock of goods brought to the community. It was destroyed by fire in 1864.

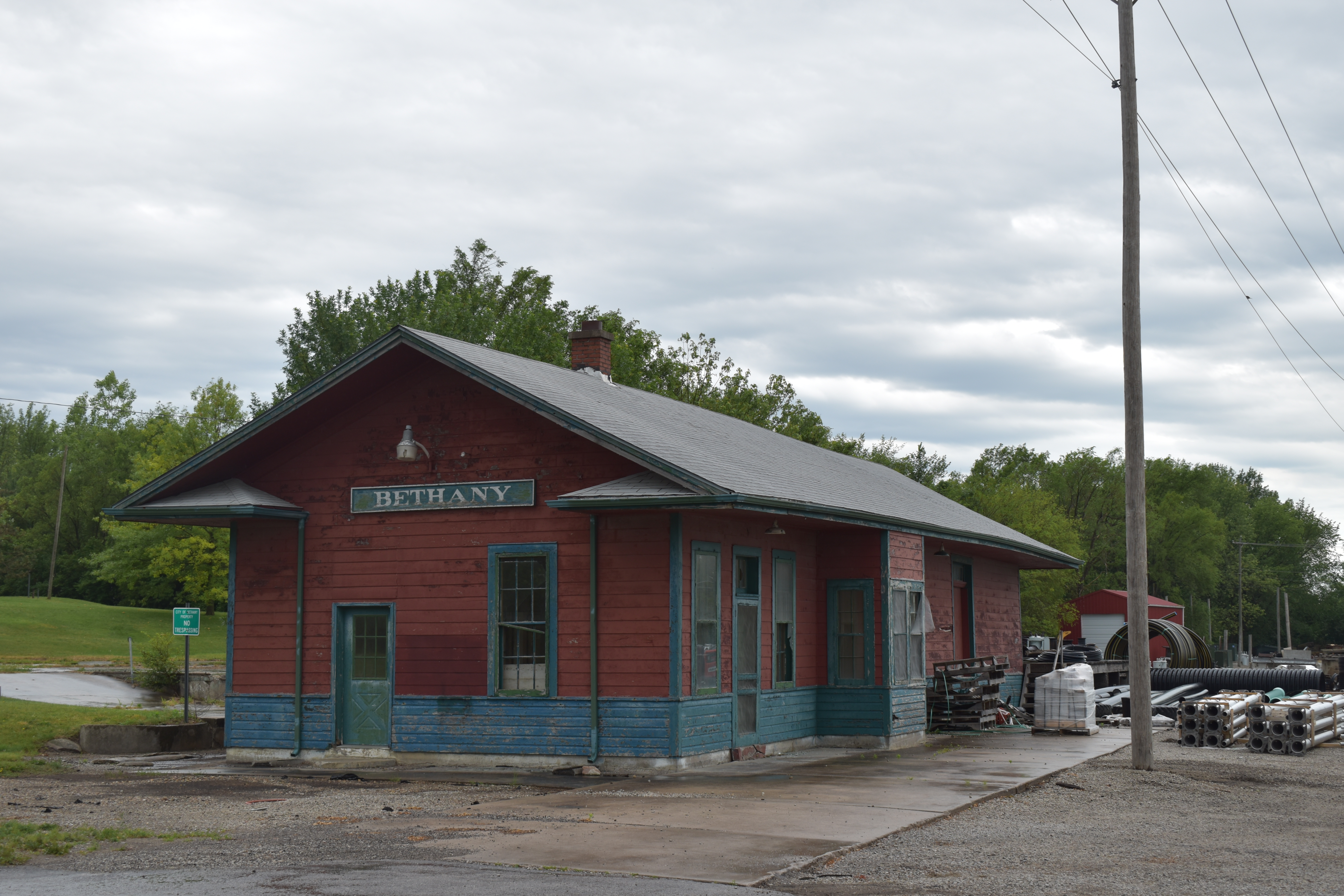
This former Chicago, Burlington, and Quincy station is in Bethany.

The Chicago, Burlington and Quincy Railroad reached Bethany in 1880. Two other railroad lines were also later laid into the county. The railroad influenced the economy and environment of the community until the early 1980s, when the last train pulled out of the Bethany Depot and the tracks were removed. Transportation was an important industry to the community and the population grew to its greatest level around the turn of the century when over 24,000 persons lived in Harrison County.

Industry was vital to Bethany's growth, starting with Colonel C.L. Jennings who erected the first steam mill around 1854 in the northwest part of town, which produced lumber and flour. Because the country was so new, little need for towns existed. For several years, few retail shops existed and development and growth of the town was slow but by 1855, Bethany was known as one of the best trading places in Northwest Missouri.

An industrial park was established in the 1940s by the Harrison County Industrial Development Authority; the Bethany Memorial Airport was opened in 1944. The first tenant in the industrial park was Calhoun Manufacturing, making agriculture machinery. Lambert Manufacturing opened a facility in 1971 and Place's Discount Stores also became a resident of the industrial park until 2001 when they sold to Pamida, with the distribution center remaining active in the park until its 2002 closure. The 120,000 square foot building was purchased by the home grown Bethany business Gumdrop Books following Pamida's closure. Later additions to the park include Superior Waste, and Tri-State Carports, which opened for business in 2001. The 1990s were a period of aggressive growth, especially within the service industry with the addition of several motels and restaurants. There has been several million dollars investment each year during the 90's and an increase of nearly 100 jobs annually.

Through the years, development continued and included the construction of a lake in 1935 to serve the water needs of the community. In 1960, a second lake was added so that Bethany could meet the increasing water needs. The Harrison County Lake was completed in 1994 and provides a third source of water for the community. In 1954, residents voted to issue bonds to build a municipal swimming pool. Numerous other utilities were upgraded from 1930 to 1970 including the construction of a water tower in 1989 to serve growth along the north side of town. In 1996, residents approved a sales tax to extend water lines from the new tower to the south side of town which resulted in a looping of the system and improved water pressure for many areas. The sales tax also funded the reconstruction of Main Street from Highway 69 to the square.

Transportation, which played an important role early in Bethany's history, came to play an even bigger role in the 1960s when Interstate 35 was constructed. This north-south four-lane highway connects Canada with Mexico. The interstate ran along the east side of town and since the completion of the interstate in the early 1970s, the community's growth has been in that direction.

The Hamilton House and Slatten House are listed on the National Register of Historic Places.

== Bethany Falls Limestone ==
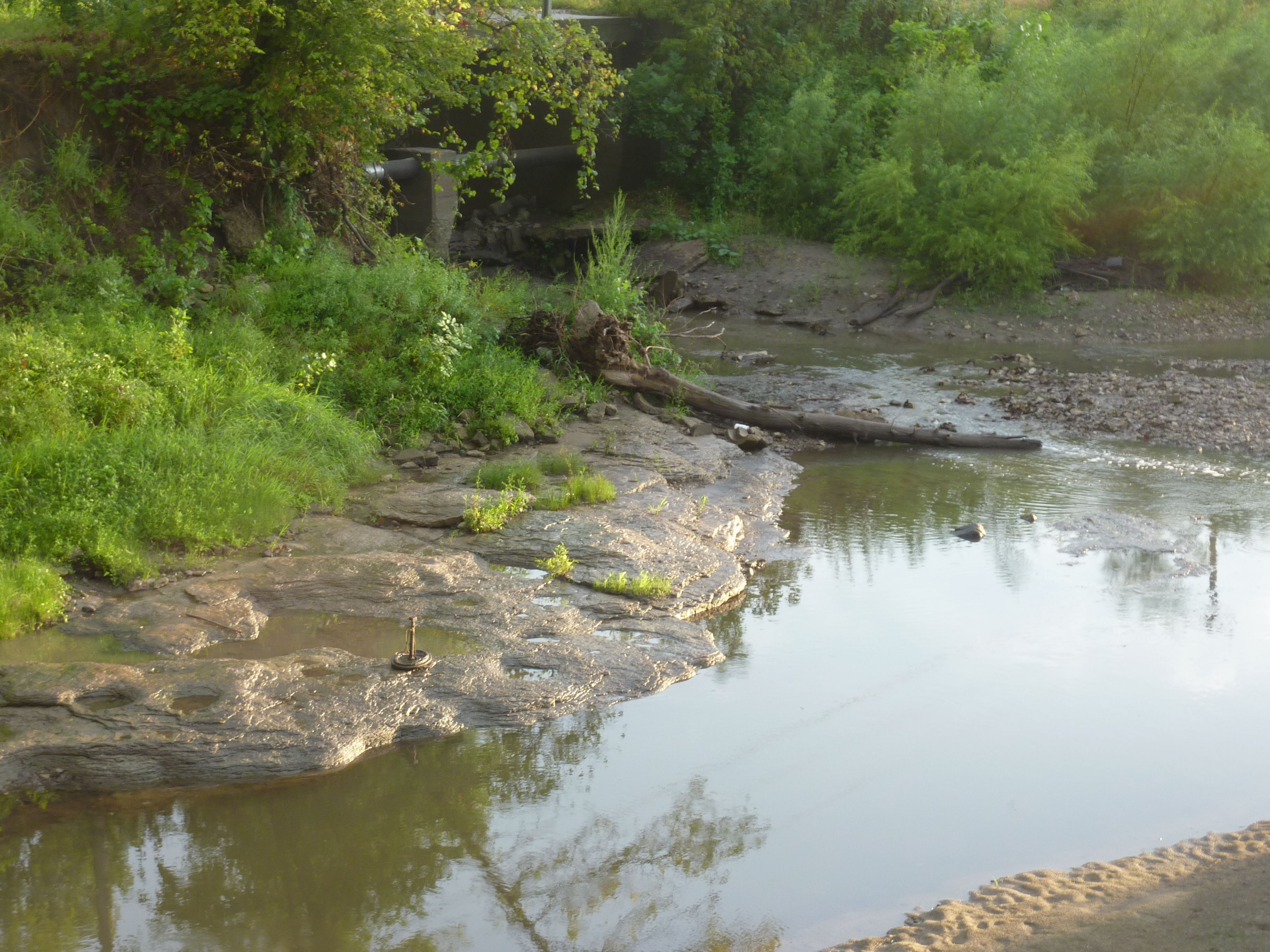
This outcropping of the Bethany Falls Limestone member is off the Main Street bridge on the west side of the city.

The Bethany Falls Limestone is a geologic member of the Swope Formation within the Kansas City Group. It was named in an 1862 study by G.C. Broadhead for an outcropping that created a waterfall on Big Creek near Bethany, Missouri. At the time, Broadhead was the state geologist for Missouri. The original waterfall no longer exists, and little of the outcropping remains exposed at the site. However, the member extends throughout the Kansas City metropolitan area, where it has been widely quarried for use in buildings and to create large underground spaces, such as the SubTropolis industrial park.

== Geography ==
Bethany is located in west central Harrison County. Big Creek flows past the western portion of the city.

According to the United States Census Bureau, the city has a total area of 4.48 square miles (11.60 km^{2}), of which 4.44 square miles (11.50 km^{2}) is land and 0.04 square miles (0.10 km^{2}) is water.

=== Climate ===
Bethany's climate is characterized as a humid continental climate with distinct influence from subtropical air masses in summer along with cold winters.

Climate data for Bethany, Missouri (1991–2020 normals, extremes 1893–present)
Month	Jan	Feb	Mar	Apr	May	Jun	Jul	Aug	Sep	Oct	Nov	Dec	Year
Record high °F (°C)	69 (21)	81 (27)	88 (31)	93 (34)	102 (39)	103 (39)	110 (43)	112 (44)	105 (41)	96 (36)	84 (29)	72 (22)	112 (44)
Mean daily maximum °F (°C)	34.0 (1.1)	39.0 (3.9)	51.6 (10.9)	62.7 (17.1)	72.7 (22.6)	82.2 (27.9)	86.6 (30.3)	85.3 (29.6)	77.7 (25.4)	65.3 (18.5)	50.7 (10.4)	38.4 (3.6)	62.2 (16.8)
Daily mean °F (°C)	24.8 (−4.0)	29.2 (−1.6)	40.6 (4.8)	51.6 (10.9)	61.9 (16.6)	71.9 (22.2)	76.4 (24.7)	74.5 (23.6)	66.4 (19.1)	54.2 (12.3)	40.7 (4.8)	29.7 (−1.3)	51.8 (11.0)
Mean daily minimum °F (°C)	15.6 (−9.1)	19.4 (−7.0)	29.6 (−1.3)	40.6 (4.8)	51.2 (10.7)	61.7 (16.5)	66.1 (18.9)	63.7 (17.6)	55.0 (12.8)	43.1 (6.2)	30.8 (−0.7)	21.0 (−6.1)	41.5 (5.3)
Record low °F (°C)	−33 (−36)	−27 (−33)	−21 (−29)	5 (−15)	17 (−8)	38 (3)	42 (6)	38 (3)	23 (−5)	13 (−11)	−10 (−23)	−29 (−34)	−33 (−36)
Average precipitation inches (mm)	1.00 (25)	1.58 (40)	2.07 (53)	4.01 (102)	5.53 (140)	5.19 (132)	4.96 (126)	4.20 (107)	3.90 (99)	3.05 (77)	1.98 (50)	1.66 (42)	39.13 (994)
Average snowfall inches (cm)	5.4 (14)	5.2 (13)	3.3 (8.4)	0.3 (0.76)	0.0 (0.0)	0.0 (0.0)	0.0 (0.0)	0.0 (0.0)	0.0 (0.0)	0.1 (0.25)	1.3 (3.3)	5.6 (14)	21.2 (54)
Average precipitation days (≥ 0.01 in)	4.9	5.8	7.3	10.9	11.6	9.9	8.5	8.3	6.9	7.3	6.0	5.3	92.7
Average snowy days (≥ 0.1 in)	3.0	2.7	0.9	0.3	0.0	0.0	0.0	0.0	0.0	0.1	0.7	2.4	10.1
Source: NOAA

== Demographics ==
Historical population
Census	Pop.	Note	%±
1880	994		—
1890	1,105		11.2%
1900	2,093		89.4%
1910	1,931		−7.7%
1920	2,080		7.7%
1930	2,209		6.2%
1940	2,682		21.4%
1950	2,714		1.2%
1960	2,771		2.1%
1970	2,914		5.2%
1980	3,095		6.2%
1990	3,005		−2.9%
2000	3,087		2.7%
2010	3,292		6.6%
2020	2,915		−11.5%
U.S. Decennial Census

=== 2020 census ===
As of the 2020 census, Bethany had a population of 2,915. The median age was 43.7 years. 21.7% of residents were under the age of 18 and 24.9% of residents were 65 years of age or older. For every 100 females there were 90.6 males, and for every 100 females age 18 and over there were 87.9 males age 18 and over.

0.0% of residents lived in urban areas, while 100.0% lived in rural areas.

There were 1,272 households in Bethany, of which 24.1% had children under the age of 18 living in them. Of all households, 38.8% were married-couple households, 20.7% were households with a male householder and no spouse or partner present, and 34.0% were households with a female householder and no spouse or partner present. About 39.7% of all households were made up of individuals and 20.7% had someone living alone who was 65 years of age or older.

There were 1,490 housing units, of which 14.6% were vacant. The homeowner vacancy rate was 4.5% and the rental vacancy rate was 14.4%.

Racial composition as of the 2020 census
Race	Number	Percent
White	2,704	92.8%
Black or African American	13	0.4%
American Indian and Alaska Native	24	0.8%
Asian	16	0.5%
Native Hawaiian and Other Pacific Islander	1	0.0%
Some other race	40	1.4%
Two or more races	117	4.0%
Hispanic or Latino (of any race)	96	3.3%

=== 2010 census ===
As of the 2010 census, there were 3,292 people, 1,411 households, and 821 families living in the city. The population density was 741.4 inhabitants per square mile (286.3/km^{2}). There were 1,602 housing units at an average density of 360.8 per square mile (139.3/km^{2}). The racial makeup of the city was 96.4% White, 0.5% African American, 0.5% Native American, 0.3% Asian, 0.1% Pacific Islander, 1.3% from other races, and 0.9% from two or more races. Hispanic or Latino of any race were 3.0% of the population.

There were 1,411 households, of which 28.3% had children under the age of 18 living with them, 43.9% were married couples living together, 11.0% had a female householder with no husband present, 3.3% had a male householder with no wife present, and 41.8% were non-families. 36.2% of all households were made up of individuals, and 18.2% had someone living alone who was 65 years of age or older. The average household size was 2.23 and the average family size was 2.88.

The median age in the city was 41.7 years. 23.2% of residents were under the age of 18; 9% were between the ages of 18 and 24; 21.2% were from 25 to 44; 23.6% were from 45 to 64; and 22.9% were 65 years of age or older. The gender makeup of the city was 47.8% male and 52.2% female.

=== 2000 census ===
As of the census of 2000, there were 3,087 people, 1,344 households, and 817 families living in the city. The population density was 696.2 inhabitants per square mile (268.8/km^{2}). There were 1,506 housing units at an average density of 339.7 per square mile (131.2/km^{2}). The racial makeup of the city was 99.00% White, 0.10% African American, 0.32% Native American, 0.19% Asian, 0.03% from other races, and 0.36% from two or more races. Hispanic or Latino of any race were 0.62% of the population.

There were 1,344 households, out of which 24.9% had children under the age of 18 living with them, 48.1% were married couples living together, 10.2% had a female householder with no husband present, and 39.2% were non-families. 35.0% of all households were made up of individuals, and 20.1% had someone living alone who was 65 years of age or older. The average household size was 2.15 and the average family size was 2.74.

In the city the population was spread out, with 20.3% under the age of 18, 7.7% from 18 to 24, 22.2% from 25 to 44, 20.8% from 45 to 64, and 29.1% who were 65 years of age or older. The median age was 45 years. For every 100 females, there were 80.3 males. For every 100 females age 18 and over, there were 73.4 males.

The median income for a household in the city was $28,050, and the median income for a family was $35,023. Males had a median income of $27,250 versus $16,983 for females. The per capita income for the city was $15,189. About 9.5% of families and 13.0% of the population were below the poverty line, including 15.1% of those under age 18 and 17.4% of those age 65 or over.

== Education ==
It is in the South Harrison County R-II School District. South Harrison County R-II School District operates an early child center, one elementary school, South Harrison High School, and North Central Career Center.

The town has a lending library, the Bethany Public Library.

== Transportation ==
The city is served by I-35, U.S. 136 and U.S. 69. Intercity bus service to the city is provided by Jefferson Lines.

== Notable people ==
- Babe Adams, a professional baseball player who played for the Pittsburgh Pirates and pitched in three World Series games, lived in Bethany.
- Frank Buckles, the last surviving United States veteran from World War I, was born in Bethany.
- Beulah Poynter (1883–1960), an actress and writer, was raised in Bethany.
- Benjamin Prentiss, Civil War General, was postmaster of the town and is buried there.
