= KJPW =

Radio station in Waynesville, Missouri

- Waynesville, Missouri; United States
- Frequency: 1390 kHz

Programming
- Format: News talk information
- Affiliations: Fox News Radio

Ownership
- Owner: Connoisseur Media; (Alpha Media Licensee LLC)
- Sister stations: KBNN; KFBD-FM; KOZQ-FM; KJEL; KIIK

Technical information
- Licensing authority: FCC
- Facility ID: 53877
- Class: D
- Power: 5,000 watts day; 111 watts night
- Transmitter coordinates: 37°49′9.1″N 92°9′6.6″W

Links
- Public license information: Public file; LMS
- Website: Official website

KJPW (1390 AM) is a radio station broadcasting a news talk information format. Licensed to Waynesville, Missouri, United States, the station is owned by Connoisseur Media, through licensee Alpha Media Licensee LLC, and features programming from Fox News Radio.

KJPW and its sister station, KFBD-FM, are the dominant news radio providers in the Pulaski County area, which includes Fort Leonard Wood, Waynesville, and St. Robert.

The stations compete with the only other station broadcasting from Pulaski County, KFLW Radio, owned by the Lebanon Daily Record and working locally from the St. Robert offices of the Pulaski County Mirror weekly newspaper.

== History ==
Pulaski County Broadcasters, Inc. assigned the license for the station to Ozark Broadcasting, Inc. on September 29, 2003. Also assigned was the license for sister station KJPW-FM (now KOZQ-FM), in a transaction valued at $735,000. Ozark assigned the licenses for both stations, as well as KBNN, KFBD-FM, KJEL, and KIIK, to GoodRadio.TV, LLC on May 9, 2007. On September 10, 2007, the licenses for all six stations were further assigned to Waynesville/Lebanon License Co, LLC, on a pro forma basis.

Gary Knehans was honored by the Waynesville City Council on September 19, 2013, for fifty years of service as a reporter with the radio station. Knehans was hired by the original owners of the radio station about half a year after it went on the air, and now serves as operations manager for KJPW/KFBD as well as two other stations.

In December 2013, GoodRadio.TV and its subsidiaries merged into Digity, LLC. Effective February 25, 2016, Digity and its 124 radio stations were acquired by Alpha Media for $264 million. Alpha Media merged with Connoisseur Media on September 4, 2025.
