= KBNN =

Radio station in Lebanon, Missouri

- Lebanon, Missouri; United States
- Broadcast area: Ozarks
- Frequency: 750 kHz
- Branding: 750 TALK

Programming
- Format: News/talk

Ownership
- Owner: Connoisseur Media; (Alpha Media Licensee LLC)
- Sister stations: KJPW; KFBD-FM; KOZQ-FM; KJEL; KIIK

History
- First air date: October 20, 1973
- Former call signs: KJEL (1972–1996)

Technical information
- Licensing authority: FCC
- Facility ID: 51093
- Class: D
- Power: 5,000 watts day
- Transmitter coordinates: 37°41′11.1″N 92°41′35.6″W

Links
- Public license information: Public file; LMS
- Website: www.myozarksonline.com/stations/kbnn/

KBNN (750 AM) is a radio station broadcasting a news/talk format. Established in 1973, the station is licensed to Lebanon, Missouri, United States, and serves the Springfield, Missouri, area. The station is owned by Connoisseur Media and is licensed to Alpha Media Licensee LLC.

Because it shares the same frequency as WSB in Atlanta, it must shut down at sunset.

== History ==
KJEL signed on October 20, 1973, on 1080 kHz with a format of middle of the road music and news programming under the ownership of Risner Broadcasting. At the outset, 60 percent of the station's programming was simulcast with KJEL-FM (103.7), which signed on the same day. In 1980, the KJEL stations were sold to a group of businesspeople under the name KJEL, Inc. for $375,000. By 1981, KJEL had affiliated with the ABC Entertainment Network and changed to a country music format while retaining its news programming, with only 10 percent of its programming being simulcast with KJEL-FM; the following year, the two stations began simulcasting full-time.

Ozark Broadcasting purchased the KJEL stations for $450,000 in 1983; this made the stations part of the Shepherd Group. In 1985, the station moved to 750 kHz. By then, the FM station, which had become KIRK, was programming a country music format separate from KJEL. In 1988, KJEF became an affiliate of the ABC Information Network; the ABC Entertainment Network affiliation moved to KIRK. On December 1, 1996, the call letters were changed to KBNN, and the station took on a talk radio format.

In March 2007, GoodRadio.TV LLC agreed to buy the Shepherd Group's stations, including KBNN, for $30.6 million. In 2013, GoodRadio.TV was merged into Digity, LLC (both companies were controlled by Dean Goodman) as part of Digity's acquisition of NextMedia. Effective February 25, 2016, Digity was acquired by Alpha Media for $264 million. Alpha Media merged with Connoisseur Media on September 4, 2025.
