= KOZQ-FM =

Radio station in Waynesville, Missouri

- Waynesville, Missouri; United States
- Frequency: 102.3 MHz
- Branding: Z102.3

Programming
- Format: Classic rock

Ownership
- Owner: Connoisseur Media; (Alpha Media Licensee LLC)
- Sister stations: KJPW; KBNN; KFBD-FM; KJEL; KIIK

History
- First air date: May 2, 1968
- Former call signs: KYSD (1969–1981); KJPW-FM (1981–2007); KIIK-FM (2007–2011)

Technical information
- Licensing authority: FCC
- Facility ID: 53876
- Class: A
- ERP: 2,650 watts
- HAAT: 150 meters (490 ft)
- Transmitter coordinates: 37°49′9.1″N 92°9′6.6″W

Links
- Public license information: Public file; LMS
- Website: www.myozarksonline.com

KOZQ-FM (102.3 FM) is a radio station licensed to Waynesville, Missouri, United States. The station is owned by Connoisseur Media, through licensee Alpha Media Licensee LLC.

The station signed in on May 2, 1968, as KJPW-FM. Station call letters changed to KYSD in 1969, along with a top 40 format. By 1972, KYSD was programming country full-time. The station was assigned the call letters KJPW-FM on May 21, 1981. On December 13, 2007, the station changed its call sign to KIIK-FM, and on September 23, 2011, to the current KOZQ-FM.
