= KFBD-FM =

Radio station in Waynesville, Missouri

- Waynesville, Missouri; United States
- Broadcast area: Waynesville, Missouri; Rolla, Missouri
- Frequency: 97.9 MHz
- Branding: 97.9 the Source

Programming
- Format: Adult contemporary

Ownership
- Owner: Connoisseur Media; (Alpha Media Licensee LLC)
- Sister stations: KJPW; KBNN; KOZQ-FM; KJEL; KIIK

History
- First air date: December 9, 1964

Technical information
- Licensing authority: FCC
- Facility ID: 4259
- Class: C3
- ERP: 10,000 watts
- HAAT: 157 meters (515 ft)
- Transmitter coordinates: 37°56′50.1″N 92°21′18.6″W

Links
- Public license information: Public file; LMS
- Webcast: Listen live
- Website: www.myozarksonline.com

KFBD-FM (97.9 FM) is a radio station licensed to Waynesville, Missouri, United States. The station is owned by Connoisseur Media, through licensee Alpha Media Licensee LLC.

KFBD-FM and its AM sister station, KJPW, are the dominant news radio providers in the Pulaski County area, which includes Fort Leonard Wood, Waynesville, and St. Robert.

The stations compete with the only other station broadcasting from Pulaski County, KFLW Radio, owned by the Lebanon Daily Record and working locally from the St. Robert offices of the Pulaski County Mirror weekly newspaper.

Gary Knehans was honored by the Waynesville City Council on Sept. 19, 2013, for fifty years of service as a reporter with the radio station. Knehans was hired by the original owners of the radio station about half a year after it went on the air, originally with the call letters KJPW, and now serves as operations manager for KJPW/KFBD as well as two other stations.

== History ==
The station first signed on the air on December 9, 1964. It first aired a MOR format before becoming a Top 40 format in 1981. KFBD-FM is one out of the two Rolla dominant affiliates for Rick Dees Weekly Top 40 in the 1980s, with the other being KCLU. The Top 40 format continued to last throughout the rest of the 1980s and into the early 1990s. When the early 1990s began rolling along, the station began simulcasting KOZQ which still airs Top 40 at the time. A few years later, it became a news/talk station.
