= Joachim Creek =

Stream in the American state of Missouri

Joachim Creek is a stream in Jefferson and St. Francois counties in the U.S. state of Missouri. It is a tributary to the Mississippi River.

The stream headwaters arise in northern St. Francois County southeast of Halifax and it flows north roughly parallel to and east of US Route 67. The stream enters Jefferson County and just northeast of Valles Mines the stream turns to the northwest and passes under Route 67. The stream turns north and passes through De Soto and continues northeast past Victoria and Hematite. West of Festus the stream meanders north and northwest past Silica and Ludwigs. It then turns eastward passes under US Route 55 and the south side of Herculaneum to its confluence with the Mississippi.

The source area is at 38°00′03″N 90°28′38″W and the confluence is at 38°15′39″N 90°22′19″W.

St. Joachim might be the namesake. Variant names include Swashing or Swashin Creek, Yokum Creek and Joachun River.

== See also ==
- List of rivers of Missouri
