= John Clay (offensive tackle) =

American football player (born 1964)

No. 78, 77
- Position: Offensive tackle

Personal information
- Born: May 1, 1964 (age 62); St. Louis, Missouri, U.S.
- Listed height: 6 ft 5 in (1.96 m)
- Listed weight: 300 lb (136 kg)

Career information
- High school: Cedar Hill (MO) Northwest
- College: Missouri
- NFL draft: 1987: 1st round, 15th overall pick

Career history
- Los Angeles Raiders (1987); San Diego Chargers (1988)

Awards and highlights
- Consensus All-American (1986); Second-team All-American (1985); Third-team All-American (1984); 3× First-team All-Big Eight (1984, 1985, 1986)

Career NFL statistics
- Games played: 12
- Games started: 10
- Fumble recoveries: 1
- Stats at Pro Football Reference

John Gregory Clay (born May 1, 1964) is an American former professional football player who was an offensive tackle in the National Football League (NFL) for two seasons during the late 1980s.

Clay was born in St. Louis, Missouri, and played scholastically at Northwest High School in Cedar Hill.

He played college football for the University of Missouri, where he was a three-time All-American. He was a third-team selection as a sophomore, second-team as a junior, and earned consensus first-team honors as a senior.

Pre-draft measurables
Height	Weight	Arm length	Hand span	40-yard dash	10-yard split	20-yard split	20-yard shuttle	Vertical jump	Broad jump	Bench press
6 ft 5 3/8 in (1.97 m)	320 lb (145 kg)	33 1/4 in (0.84 m)	9 3/4 in (0.25 m)	5.51 s	1.83 s	3.15 s	4.77 s	25.0 in (0.64 m)	7 ft 1 in (2.16 m)	16 reps
All values from NFL Combine

He was selected by the Los Angeles Raiders in the first round (15th pick overall) of the 1987 NFL draft.

After his rookie season, the Raiders traded Clay to the San Diego Chargers in exchange for star offensive lineman Jim Lachey.

On January 5, 2016, John Gregory Clay was officially named as the head coach of the Cahokia Comanche football team.
