= High Ridge (disambiguation) =

High Ridge may refer to:

- High Ridge, Maryland
- High Ridge, Missouri
- High Ridge Township, Jefferson County, Missouri
