= David Frisch (American football) =

American football player (born 1970)

No. 47, 83, 88, 80
- Position: Tight end

Personal information
- Born: June 22, 1970 (age 56); Kirkwood, Missouri, U.S.
- Listed height: 6 ft 7 in (2.01 m)
- Listed weight: 260 lb (118 kg)

Career information
- High school: Northwest (Cedar Hill, Missouri)
- College: Iowa Central; Missouri; Colorado State
- NFL draft: 1993: undrafted

Career history
- Cincinnati Bengals (1993–1994); New England Patriots (1995); Minnesota Vikings (1996); Washington Redskins (1997)

Career NFL statistics
- Receptions: 9
- Receiving Yards: 70
- Receiving touchdowns: 1
- Stats at Pro Football Reference

David Joseph Frisch Jr. (born June 22, 1970) is an American former professional football player who was a tight end in the National Football League (NFL). He played college football for the Missouri Tigers and Colorado State Rams.

Frisch was born to David and Janet (Wecker) Frisch. He attended Northwest High School in Cedar Hill, Missouri. After high school, he played college football at Iowa Central Community College, the University of Missouri and Colorado State University.

He played with the Cincinnati Bengals as a tight-end from 1993 to 1995. Frisch was with the New England Patriots for a year in 1995 and then played with the Minnesota Vikings. He ended his career after a few years with the Washington Redskins.

Frisch is a descendant of Rev. Martin Boehm and Lt. John Gibbs.
