= Missouri Route 110 (Jefferson County) =

State highway in Missouri, U.S.

Route 110
- MO 110 highlighted in red

Route information
- Maintained by MoDOT
- Length: 6.385 mi (10.276 km)

Major junctions
- West end: Route 21 north of De Soto
- East end: US 67 / Route CC west of Olympian Village

Location
- Country: United States
- State: Missouri
- County: Jefferson

Highway system
- Missouri State Highway System; Interstate; US; State; Supplemental
← Route 110 (CKC)	→ Route 111

Route 110 is a 6.385-mile (10.276 km) state highway in Jefferson County, Missouri, United States, that connects Missouri Route 21 (Route 21), a few miles north of De Soto with U.S. Route 67 (US 67), west of Olympian Village.

== Route description ==
Route 110 begins at a T intersection with Route 21 north of De Soto, heading southeast on a two-lane undivided road. The route passes through wooded areas with some fields and homes, crossing over Union Pacific Railroad's De Soto Subdivision and coming to an intersection with Route P. The road leaves the De Soto area and heads east through more rural areas with some development. Farther east, Route 110 comes to its eastern terminus at a diamond interchange with US 67 immediately west of the city limits of Olympian Village, where Route CC heads to the north.

== History ==
In the early 1970s Route 110 was remade and expanded bigger, but the old remnants of it Fountain City Road in De Soto still remains, but it is also known as Old Highway 110 or Fountain City Road- Old Highway 110.

In January 2012, the Missouri Highways and Transportation Commission approved the use of Route 110 to include all of Missouri's part of the Chicago–Kansas City Expressway and to correspond to Illinois Route 110 from Hannibal, Missouri to Chicago, Illinois. The CKC Route 110 follows Interstate 35 from Claycomo northeast of Kansas City to U.S. Route 36 (US 36) in Cameron then follows US 36 (and the short part of Interstate 72) to Hannibal. Despite this, the Jefferson County Route 110 remained unchanged.

The intersection with Route 21 was relocated to the south in July 2018.

== Major intersections ==
The entire route is in Jefferson County.

Location	mi	km	Destinations	Notes
	0.000	0.000	Route 21 north – Hillsboro, St. Louis Route 21 south – De Soto, Potosi	Western terminus; T intersection
De Soto	1.544	2.485	Main Street south to Route E	T intersection
De Soto	1.826	2.939	Route P north – Hematite, Festus; Desoto Dr south	
	6.294	10.129	US 67 north – Festus, Crystal City, St. Louis US 67 south – Bonne Terre, Farmington, Poplar Bluff	Eastern terminus; diamond interchange
	6.294	10.129	Route CC – Olympian Village, Festus	Continuation east from eastern terminus
1.000 mi = 1.609 km; 1.000 km = 0.621 mi

== See also ==
- List of state highways in Missouri
