= House Springs, Missouri =

Unincorporated community in Missouri, U.S.

- Valentine Leight General Store in House Springs

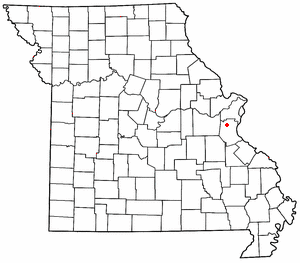
- Location in Missouri
- Coordinates: 38°24′32″N 90°34′12″W
- Country: United States
- State: Missouri
- County: Jefferson
- Time zone: UTC−6 (Central (CST))
  - Summer (DST): UTC−5 (CDT)

House Springs is an unincorporated community in Jefferson County, Missouri, United States. It is located just off Route 30, at the intersection with Routes MM and W near Byrnes Mill.

A post office has been in operation at House Springs since 1833. The community is named after Adam House, who settled there ca. 1795, and who was killed near a spring by Native Americans.

The Valentine Leight General Store and Moder Archeological District are listed on the National Register of Historic Places.

== Education ==
Northwest R-I School District serves House Springs. House Springs Elementary School is in the area. Northwest High School in Cedar Hill is the local high school.

Our Lady Queen of Peace School of the Roman Catholic Archdiocese of St. Louis was established circa 1967. Enrollment was around 200 in the beginning of the 2000s. By 2018-2019 it was down to 57, and by 2019-2020 it was down to 46. In the last several years each teacher had to cover two grade levels.
