= Dan LaRose =

American football player (1939–2019)

- LaRose in 1963

No. 77, 87, 80
- Positions: Tackle, guard, defensive end

Personal information
- Born: February 8, 1939; Crystal City, Missouri, U.S.
- Died: April 27, 2019 (aged 80); Luther, Michigan, U.S.
- Listed height: 6 ft 5 in (1.96 m)
- Listed weight: 250 lb (113 kg)

Career information
- High school: Crystal City
- College: Missouri
- NFL draft: 1961: 2nd round, 23rd overall pick
- AFL draft: 1961: 3rd round, 19th overall pick

Career history
- Detroit Lions (1961–1963); Pittsburgh Steelers (1964); San Francisco 49ers (1965); Atlanta Falcons (1966)*; Denver Broncos (1966)
- * Offseason or practice squad member only

Awards and highlights
- Unanimous All-American (1960); 2× First-team All-Big Eight (1958, 1960); Second-team All-Big Eight (1959)

Career NFL/AFL statistics
- Games played: 65
- Games started: 43
- Fumble recoveries: 2
- Stats at Pro Football Reference

Marvin Daniel LaRose (February 8, 1939 – April 27, 2019) was an American professional football player for six seasons in the National Football League (NFL) and American Football League (AFL). He played college football for the Missouri Tigers, earning unanimous All-American honors in 1960. He was selected by the Detroit Lions in the second round of the 1961 NFL draft, and also by the Boston Patriots in the third round of the 1961 AFL draft.

== Early life ==
LaRose was born in Crystal City, Missouri. He attended Crystal City High School, where he played high school football for the Crystal City Hornets.

== College career ==
While attending the University of Missouri in Columbia, Missouri, LaRose played for coach Dan Devine's Missouri Tigers football team from 1958 to 1960. He led the team in receiving yardage as a sophomore and again as a senior, and was a first-team all-conference selection after those seasons. He was a key member of the 1960 Tigers team that posted an undefeated 11–0 record, claimed the Big Eight Conference championship, won the 1961 Orange Bowl, and finished No. 4 in the Coaches Poll. Following his senior season in 1960, LaRose was recognized as a unanimous first-team All-American at the end position, having been a first-team selection of the Associated Press (AP), the American Football Coaches Association (AFCA), the Football Writers Association of America (FWAA), Newspaper Enterprise Association (NEA), The Sporting News, United Press International (UPI), Central Press Association (CPA), Time magazine, and the Walter Camp Football Foundation. He was inducted into the University of Missouri Intercollegiate Athletics Hall of Fame in 1992.

== Professional career ==
The Detroit Lions chose LaRose in the second round, 23rd overall pick, of the 1961 NFL Draft, and he played for the Lions from 1961 to 1963. He was also a member of the Pittsburgh Steelers (1964), San Francisco 49ers (1965) and Denver Broncos (1966). In six professional seasons, LaRose played in 65 regular season games.

== See also ==
- Missouri Tigers
- List of University of Missouri alumni
