= Melzo, Missouri =

Unincorporated community in Missouri, U.S.

Coordinates: 38°00′36″N 90°34′10″W

Melzo is an unincorporated community in southern Jefferson County, in the U.S. state of Missouri. The community is located on Missouri Route E just north of the Jefferson-St. Francois county line. DeSoto is eight miles to the north and Bone Terre is approximately six miles to the south.

== History ==
A post office called Melzo was established in 1906, and remained in operation until 1938. An early postmaster gave the community the first name of his son, Melzo Higginbotham.
