= Flucom, Missouri =

Unincorporated community in Missouri, U.S.

Coordinates: 38°06′04″N 90°26′33″W

Flucom is an unincorporated community in southern Jefferson County, in the U.S. state of Missouri. The community is located on Plattin Creek approximately eight miles south of Festus. US Route 67 passes about two miles to the west.

== History ==
A post office called Flucom was established in 1891, and remained in operation until 1921. According to tradition, the name Flucom is a transfer from a similarly named place in Germany.
