= Louis J. and Harriet Rozier House =

Historic house in Missouri, United States

- U.S. National Register of Historic Places
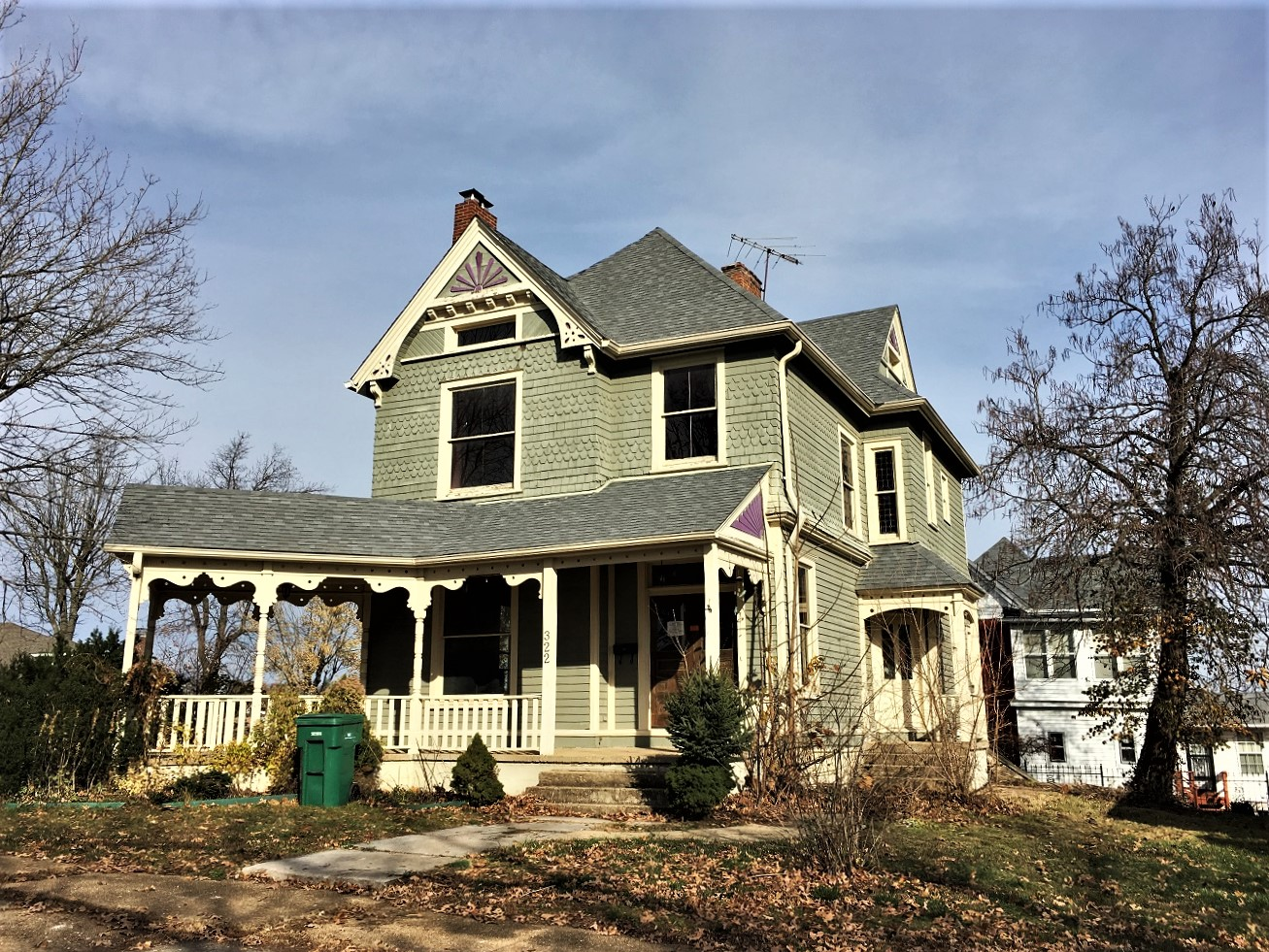

- Location within Missouri Location within the United States
- Location: 322 W. Clement, De Soto, Missouri
- Coordinates: 38°8′16″N 90°33′27″W
- Area: less than one acre
- Built: 1887
- Architect: Handcock, Charles Henry Rains
- Architectural style: Queen Anne
- NRHP reference No.: 06000221
- Added to NRHP: April 5, 2006

Louis J. and Harriet Rozier House is a historic home located at De Soto, Jefferson County, Missouri. It was built in 1887, and is a two-story, asymmetrical, Queen Anne style frame dwelling. It sits on a rock-faced limestone foundation and has a hipped roof and lower cross gables. It features a one-story wraparound porch, spindlework, and fishscale shingles.

It was listed on the National Register of Historic Places in 2006.
