= Northwest R-I School District =

School district in Missouri, United States

Location
- 4300 Gravois Road House Springs, MO 63051 United States

District information
- Superintendent: Kyle Gibbs
- Schools: 10
- Budget: $69,339,000
- NCES District ID: 2922890

Students and staff
- Students: 6,220 (As of 2017)
- Teachers: 413 (As of 2017)
- District mascot: Lion

Other information
- Website: District Website

Northwest R-I School District is a school district located in Jefferson County, Missouri serving High Ridge, Dittmer, House Springs, Cedar Hill and a portion of Fenton.

== About ==
Northwest R-I ranks 27th out of 562 school districts in the state of Missouri in terms of student body population. 93% of the student body is White. 91% of students of Northwest R-I graduate from high school. The average ACT score is 20 falling almost a point below the Missouri average as of the 2017 school year.

== History ==
In 2017 the district had 6,300 students. Desi Kirchofer became superintendent in 2017. With a vote of 7-0, the Northwest R-1 Board of Education voted Dr. Jennifer Hecktor to become the new superintendent on July 1, 2022 following Dr.Kirchofer's retirement on May 31, 2022.

== List of schools ==
=== Pre-K ===
- Northwest Early Child Center

=== Elementary schools ===
- Brennan Woods Elementary
- Cedar Springs Elementary
- High Ridge Elementary
- Maple Grove Elementary
- Murphy Elementary
- House Springs Elementary

=== Middle schools ===
- Woodridge Middle School
- Northwest Valley Middle School

=== High schools ===
- Northwest High School
