= Valentine Leight General Store =

- U.S. National Register of Historic Places
- Valentine Leight General Store, October 2026

- Location within Missouri Location within the United States
- Location: 4566 Main St., House Springs, Missouri
- Coordinates: 38°24′37″N 90°34′9″W
- Area: less than one acre
- Built: c. 1894-1910
- Architectural style: Late Victorian
- NRHP reference No.: 92001014
- Added to NRHP: August 18, 1992

The Valentine Leight General Store, also known as V. Leight New Store, Leight Mercantile Co., and Garden of Eva, is a historic general store located at House Springs, Jefferson County, Missouri. It was built in three stages between about 1894 and 1910, and is a one- to two-story, frame building with Late Victorian style detailing. It is sheathed in weatherboard and measures 88 feet wide by 40 feet deep.

It was listed on the National Register of Historic Places in 1992.
