= Central School Campus =

- U.S. National Register of Historic Places
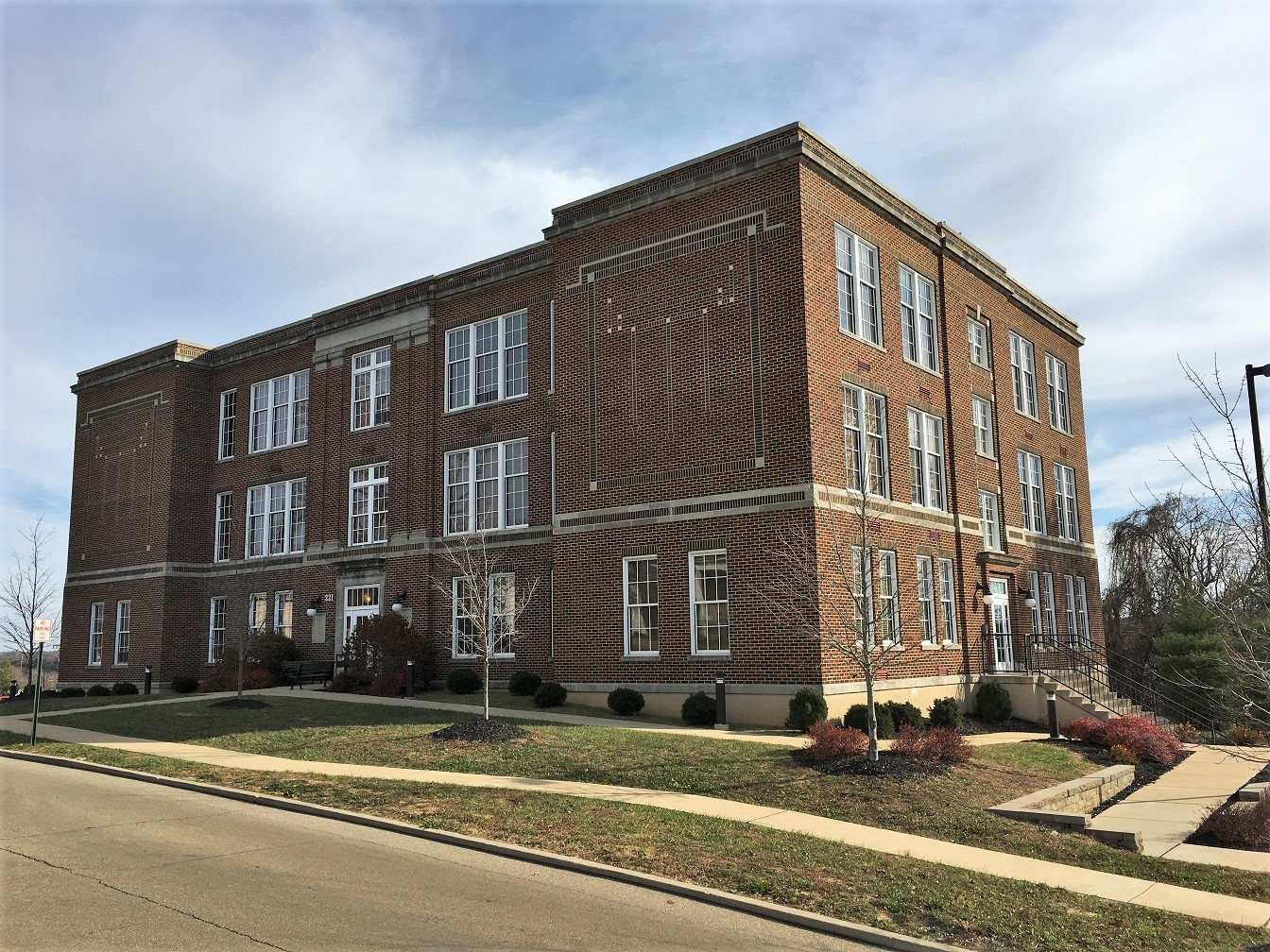

- Location within Missouri Location within the United States
- Location: 221 S. 3rd. St., De Soto, Missouri
- Coordinates: 38°8′15″N 90°33′21″W
- Area: 2.7 acres (1.1 ha)
- Built: 1882, 1927, 1950
- Architect: Laubis, Martin; et al.
- Architectural style: Classical Revival
- NRHP reference No.: 09000813
- Added to NRHP: October 8, 2009

Central School Campus, also known as Central School and DeSoto High School, is a historic school complex located at De Soto, Jefferson County, Missouri. The Central School was built about 1882, and remodeled into its current form in 1950. It is a 2 1/2- to 3-story rectangular brick building. The DeSoto High School was built in 1927, and is a three-story, textured brick building with a flat roof and accented with limestone or cast stone ornament reflecting the Classical Revival style.

It was listed on the National Register of Historic Places in 2009.
