= Big River Township =

Big River Township is the name of two townships in the U.S. state of Missouri:

- Big River Township, Jefferson County, Missouri
- Big River Township, Saint Francois County, Missouri

== See also ==
- Big River (disambiguation)
