= Plattin Township, Jefferson County, Missouri =

Township in Jefferson County, Missouri, U.S.

Plattin Township
- Inactive Township
- Coordinates: 38.1°N 90.4°W
- Country: United States of America
- State: Missouri
- County: Jefferson

Area
  - Total: 103.1 sq mi (267 km^{2})

Population (2020)
  - Total: 11,817
  - Density: 114.6/sq mi (44.25/km^{2})
- GNIS feature ID: 766826

Plattin Township is an inactive township in Jefferson County, in the U.S. state of Missouri.

Plattin Township takes its name from Plattin Creek.
