= Missouri Route 110 =

Missouri Route 110 may refer to:

- Missouri Route 110 (Jefferson County) (Route 110)--this is the original Route 110, prior to the Route 110 designation for the Missouri segment of the CKC Expressway
- Chicago–Kansas City Expressway (CKC Expressway) section in Missouri--in 2012 this road is numbered 110 to match Illinois Route 110, but has no connection with the other state highway
