= Valle Township, Jefferson County, Missouri =

Township in Jefferson County, Missouri, U.S.

Valle Township
- Inactive Township
- Coordinates: 38.1°N 90.6°W
- Country: United States of America
- State: Missouri
- County: Jefferson

Area
  - Total: 88.1 sq mi (228 km^{2})

Population (2020)
  - Total: 15,362
  - Density: 174/sq mi (67.3/km^{2})
- GNIS feature ID: 766828

Valle Township is an inactive township in Jefferson County, in the U.S. state of Missouri. It contains the census-designated places of Briarwood Estates and Summer Set.

Valle Township derives its name from Valles Mines.
