= Briarwood Estates, Missouri =

- Census-designated place
- Location within Missouri Location within the United States
- Coordinates: 38°09′23″N 90°35′25″W
- Country: United States
- State: Missouri
- County: Jefferson
- Township: Valle

Area
  - Total: 0.81 sq mi (2.09 km^{2})
  - Land: 0.68 sq mi (1.76 km^{2})
  - Water: 0.13 sq mi (0.33 km^{2})
- Elevation: 617 ft (188 m)

Population (2020)
  - Total: 347
  - Density: 510.0/sq mi (196.91/km^{2})
- Time zone: UTC-6 (Central (CST))
  - Summer (DST): UTC-5 (CDT)
- ZIP Code: 63020 (De Soto)
- Area code: 636
- FIPS code: 29-08294
- GNIS feature ID: 2806406

Briarwood Estates is an unincorporated community and census-designated place (CDP) in Jefferson County, Missouri, United States. It is in the southern part of the county, northwest of De Soto. It is a residential community built around three lakes: Lake Briarwood, Fishermans Lake, and Spring Lake. Missouri Route 21 passes between Briarwood Estates and De Soto, leading northeast 44 miles (71 km) to St. Louis and southwest 24 miles (39 km) to Potosi.

As of the 2020 census, Briarwood Estates had a population of 347.

Briarwood Estates was first listed as a CDP prior to the 2020 census.

== Demographics ==
Historical population
Census	Pop.	Note	%±
2020	347		—
U.S. Decennial Census

Briarwood Estates first appeared as a census designated place in the 2020 U.S. census.
