= Summer Set =

Summer Set or Summerset may refer to:

Music:

- "Summer Set", a 1960 single by Mr. Acker Bilk and His Paramount Jazz Band
- The Summer Set, American pop-punk band

Places in the United States:

- Summer Set, Missouri
- Summerset, South Dakota
