= Local, Missouri =

Unincorporated community in Missouri, U.S.

Coordinates: 38°22′25″N 90°37′22″W

Local is an unincorporated community in Jefferson County, in the U.S. state of Missouri.

== History ==
A post office called Local was established in 1887, and remained in operation until 1904. It is uncertain why the name Local was applied to this community.
