= Valles Mines, Missouri =

Unincorporated community in Missouri, U.S.

Coordinates: 38°02′31″N 90°29′59″W

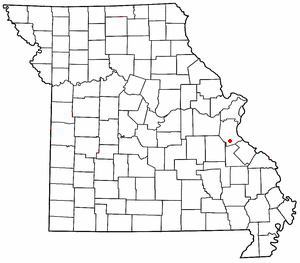

Valles Mines is an unincorporated community in southern Jefferson County, Missouri, United States. It is located approximately seven miles south of De Soto. It is located on Missouri Route V less than one mile west of U.S. Route 67. Joachim Creek flows past the north side of the community. The ZIP Code for Valles Mines is 63087.

A post office called Valles Mines was established in 1826. The community is named after François Vallé, who established lead mines there in the 18th century.
