= Papin, Missouri =

Unincorporated community in Missouri, U.S.

Coordinates: 38°04′04″N 90°28′14″W

Papin is an unincorporated community in Jefferson County, in the U.S. state of Missouri.

The community has the name of the local Papin family.
