= Rock Township, Jefferson County, Missouri =

Township in Jefferson County, Missouri, U.S.

Rock Township
- Inactive Township
- Coordinates: 38.5°N 90.5°W
- Country: United States of America
- State: Missouri
- County: Jefferson

Area
  - Total: 25.4 sq mi (66 km^{2})

Population (2020)
  - Total: 32,673
  - Density: 1,290/sq mi (497/km^{2})
- GNIS feature ID: 766827

Rock Township is an inactive township in Jefferson County, in the U.S. state of Missouri.

Rock Township was established in 1834, and named for the rocky terrain within its borders.
