= Summer Set, Missouri =

- Census-designated place
- Location within Missouri Location within the United States
- Coordinates: 38°5′25″N 90°34′31″W
- Country: United States
- State: Missouri
- County: Jefferson
- Township: Valle

Area
  - Total: 1.05 sq mi (2.73 km^{2})
  - Land: 0.91 sq mi (2.36 km^{2})
  - Water: 0.14 sq mi (0.36 km^{2}) 1%
- Elevation: 680 ft (210 m)

Population (2020)
  - Total: 1,127
  - Density: 1,235.7/sq mi (477.12/km^{2})
- Time zone: UTC-6 (Central (CST))
  - Summer (DST): UTC-5 (CDT)
- ZIP Code: 63020 (De Soto)
- Area code: 636
- FIPS code: 29-71508
- GNIS feature ID: 2806410

Summer Set is an unincorporated community and census-designated place (CDP) in Jefferson County, Missouri, United States. It is in the southern part of the county, 3 miles (5 km) south of De Soto. It is a residential community built around three artificial lakes: Summerset Lake, Winterhaven Lake, and Spring Lake. As of the 2020 census, Summer Set had a population of 1,127.

Summer Set was first listed as a CDP prior to the 2020 census.

== Demographics ==
Historical population
Census	Pop.	Note	%±
2020	1,127		—
U.S. Decennial Census

Summer Set first appeared as a census designated place in the 2020 U.S. census.
