= Munsons, Missouri =

Unincorporated community in Missouri, U.S.

Coordinates: 38°15′05″N 90°25′34″W

Munsons is an unincorporated community in Jefferson County, in the U.S. state of Missouri.

The community has the name of one Judge Munson, a pioneer citizen.
