= Central Township, Jefferson County, Missouri =

Township in Jefferson County, Missouri, U.S.

Central Township
- Inactive Township
- Interactive map of Central Township
- Coordinates: 38.2°N 90.6°W
- Country: United States of America
- State: Missouri
- County: Jefferson

Area
  - Total: 74.1 sq mi (192 km^{2})

Population (2020)
  - Total: 14,627
  - Density: 197/sq mi (76.2/km^{2})
- GNIS feature ID: 766823

Central Township is an inactive township in Jefferson County, in the U.S. state of Missouri. It contains the census-designated place of Raintree Plantation.

Central Township was established in 1842, and named for its central location.
