= Frumet, Missouri =

Unincorporated community in Missouri, U.S.

Coordinates: 38°09′34″N 90°41′35″W

Frumet is an unincorporated community in Jefferson County, in the U.S. state of Missouri.

== History ==
A post office called Frumet was established in 1870, and remained in operation until 1911. The community took its name from a lead-mining company which operated near the site.
