= Knorpp, Missouri =

Unincorporated community in Missouri, U.S.

Coordinates: 38°05′18″N 90°27′46″W

Knorpp is an unincorporated community in Jefferson County, in the U.S. state of Missouri.

== History ==
A post office called Knorpp was established in 1890, and remained in operation until 1914. C. F. Knorpp, an early postmaster, gave the community his last name.
