= Ware, Missouri =

Unincorporated community in Missouri, U.S.

Coordinates: 38°12′49″N 90°39′45″W

Ware is an unincorporated community in Jefferson County, in the U.S. state of Missouri.

== History ==
A post office called Ware was established in 1882, and remained in operation until 1906. The community has the name of Bob Ware, a local storekeeper.
