= Seckman, Missouri =

Unincorporated community in Missouri, U.S.

Coordinates: 38°24′08″N 90°26′00″W

Seckman is an unincorporated community in Jefferson County, in the U.S. state of Missouri.

== History ==
A post office called Seckman was established in 1889, and remained in operation until 1906. The community has the name of Henry Seckman, a local judge.
