= Plattin Creek =

Stream in the US state of Missouri

Plattin Creek is a stream in northeastern St. Francois and Jefferson counties in the U.S. state of Missouri. It is a tributary of the Mississippi River.

The headwaters arise in St. Francois County at 37°59′00″N 90°22′18″W and it flows to the north past the community of Koester to enter Jefferson County. It continues to the north passing the community of Plattin and passing under US Route 61 and I-55 at the south edge of Festus. The stream veers to the east and enters the Mississippi southeast of Crystal City at 38°12′55″N 90°21′35″W at an elevation of 390 feet.

Plattin Creek most likely derives its name from nearby La Platte Mine.

== See also ==
- List of rivers of Missouri
