= LaBarque Creek, Missouri =

Unincorporated community in Missouri, U.S.

- Census-designated place
- Location within Missouri
- Coordinates: 38°24′58″N 90°40′40″W
- Country: United States
- State: Missouri
- County: Jefferson

Area
  - Total: 17.64 sq mi (45.68 km^{2})
  - Land: 17.57 sq mi (45.50 km^{2})
  - Water: 0.073 sq mi (0.19 km^{2})
- Elevation: 630 ft (190 m)

Population (2020)
  - Total: 1,658
  - Density: 94.4/sq mi (36.44/km^{2})
- Time zone: UTC-6 (Central (CST))
  - Summer (DST): UTC-5 (CDT)
- ZIP Code: 63069
- Area code: 636
- GNIS feature ID: 2583783

LaBarque Creek is an unincorporated community and census-designated place (CDP) in Jefferson County, Missouri, United States. Its population was 1,558 as of the 2010 census.

== Geography ==
The community is in northwestern Jefferson County and is named for LaBarque Creek, a tributary of the Meramec River. It is located on Missouri Route F, approximately 3 miles (5 km) northwest of Byrnesville on Big River, 5 miles (8 km) southwest of Eureka on Interstate 44, and 33 miles (53 km) southwest of downtown St. Louis. According to the U.S. Census Bureau, the CDP has an area of 17.632 square miles (45.67 km^{2}); 17.561 square miles (45.48 km^{2}) of its area is land, and 0.071 square miles (0.18 km^{2}) is water.

== Demographics ==
Historical population
Census	Pop.	Note	%±
2010	1,558		—
2020	1,658		6.4%
U.S. Decennial Census

=== 2020 census ===
As of the 2020 census, LaBarque Creek had a population of 1,658. The median age was 46.7 years. 20.5% of residents were under the age of 18 and 18.8% of residents were 65 years of age or older. For every 100 females there were 103.4 males, and for every 100 females age 18 and over there were 103.7 males age 18 and over.

0.0% of residents lived in urban areas, while 100.0% lived in rural areas.

There were 624 households in LaBarque Creek, of which 27.9% had children under the age of 18 living in them. Of all households, 73.4% were married-couple households, 11.4% were households with a male householder and no spouse or partner present, and 11.5% were households with a female householder and no spouse or partner present. About 15.7% of all households were made up of individuals and 7.4% had someone living alone who was 65 years of age or older.

There were 636 housing units, of which 1.9% were vacant. The homeowner vacancy rate was 0.0% and the rental vacancy rate was 0.0%.

Racial composition as of the 2020 census
Race	Number	Percent
White	1,560	94.1%
Black or African American	3	0.2%
American Indian and Alaska Native	1	0.1%
Asian	8	0.5%
Native Hawaiian and Other Pacific Islander	0	0.0%
Some other race	8	0.5%
Two or more races	78	4.7%
Hispanic or Latino (of any race)	32	1.9%
