= Joachim Township, Jefferson County, Missouri =

Township in Jefferson County, Missouri, U.S.

Joachim Township
- Inactive Township
- Interactive map of Joachim Township
- Coordinates: 38.3°N 90.5°W
- Country: United States of America
- State: Missouri
- County: Jefferson

Area
  - Total: 61.6 sq mi (160 km^{2})

Population (2020)
  - Total: 20,694
  - Density: 336/sq mi (130/km^{2})
- GNIS feature ID: 766824

Joachim Township is an inactive township in Jefferson County, in the U.S. state of Missouri.

Joachim Township was established in 1818.
