= Juanita Hamel =

American artist and writer

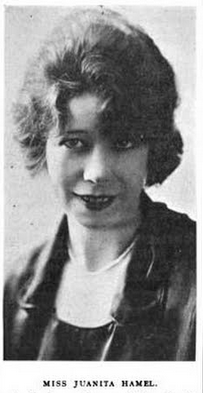
Juanita Hamel, from a 1922 publication.

Juanita Hamel Early Fowle (April 27, 1891 – July 12, 1939) was an American artist and writer whose syndicated stories and illustrations appeared in newspapers across the United States in the 1910s and 1920s.

== Early life ==
Juanita Hamel was born in DeSoto, Missouri, the daughter of Frederick G. Hamel and Lucile McCormack Hamel (later Lucile Hamel Craven). She studied at the St. Louis School of Fine Arts, part of Washington University in St. Louis.

== Career ==
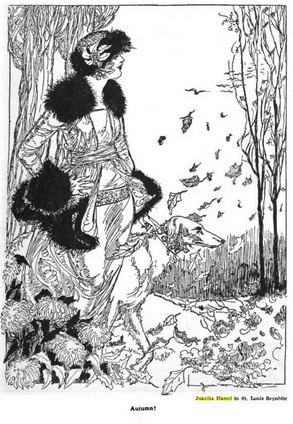
"Autumn!" (1920) by Juanita Hamel for the St. Louis Republic

By 1916, Hamel was employed as an artist at the St. Louis Times. Soon after, she moved to Chicago and joined the staff at the Chicago Herald. She moved to New York City by 1920. Her illustrations, often young pretty women with voluminous hair, were syndicated nationally through the Hearst Newspaper Feature Syndicate. She also illustrated magazines and sheet music. Her style is sometimes considered as influenced by comic artist Nell Brinkley.

She was quoted in 1921, summarizing her career path to that date:

I landed my first job on the St. Louis Times, and covered all sorts of assignments, from murder trials to interviewing Mrs. Woodrow Wilson. Then I went to the Chicago Herald where I wrote fiction in serial and short story form. Another short step and I was in New York drawing for the Newspaper Feature Service.

Fiction by Hamel included The Girls of the Second Floor Back (serialized in 1916) and The Straight Girl on the Crooked Path (serialized in 1917).

== Personal life ==
Juanita Hamel married twice. She married John Vinton "Tim" Early, a fellow newspaper illustrator, in 1921. She was widowed when Early died in 1925. She later married Alison Fowle, an English lord, and lived in Hamilton, Bermuda, with regular visits back to the United States. She died there in 1939, aged 48 years. Illustrations by Hamel are in the Swann Collection of the Library of Congress.
