= Jefferson County R-VII School District =

School district in Missouri, United States

Location
- 1250 Dooling Hollow Rd Festus, MO 63028-4276 United States

District information
- Superintendent: David Haug
- Schools: 5
- Budget: $69,339,000
- NCES District ID: 2916230

Students and staff
- Students: 1,043
- Teachers: 77
- District mascot: Blue Jays

Other information
- Website: Website

Jefferson County R-VII School District is a school district located in Jefferson County, Missouri serving Festus, Missouri and Plattin, Missouri.

== About ==
Jefferson County R-VII School District had a graduation rate of 100% in the 2016-2017 School Year. 71% of graduates go on to attend college. 93% of the student body is of Caucasian ancestry. 33% of students are eligible for free or reduced price lunch.

== List of schools ==
=== Pre-K ===
- Jefferson County R-VII Pre School

=== Elementary schools ===
- Plattin Elementary

=== Middle schools ===
- Danby Rush-Tower Middle
- Telegraph Intermediate

=== High schools ===
- Jefferson High
