= William E. Lewis =

Former American politician

Member of the Missouri House of Representatives from the 125th, 107th district
- In office 1974–1988
- Preceded by: Jack Gannon

Personal details
- Born: September 3, 1918 De Soto, Missouri
- Died: October 31, 1989 (aged 71)
- Party: Democratic
- Spouse(s): Virginia Louise Sapp, September 11, 1942
- Children: Bill Lewis, Craig Lewis, Julie Lewis Wagner, Tim Lewis
- Occupation: politician
- Profession: salesman, Army veteran

William Edwin "Bud" Lewis (September 3, 1918 - October 31, 1989) was an American politician who served as a Missouri state representative. Lewis was graduated from the De Soto public schools in 1937. In 1940, he enlisted in the U.S. Army, serving with the 30th Infantry Division in the European Theater of World War II until 1945. During the war, he married Virginia Louise Sapp on September 11, 1942. In 1965, he retired from the U.S. Army Reserves at the rank of major.
