= Matthew "Mack" Harrison Marsden =

Matthew "Mack" Harrison Marsden (c. 1849–1883) was a livestock trader who lived in rural Jefferson County, Missouri. Marsden was suspected of many crimes from 1881 to 1883, including arson, murder and robbery although he was often accused, questioned, and arrested. He was only brought to trial once, and was acquitted. Marsden's family background gave no hint of criminal activity. On the contrary, he came from an established family of farmers, engineers, and stockmen, and his wife's family members were known as leaders of the local church. His story came to an end when he was murdered. Although four different men were arrested, and three of them tried for the killing, no one was ever convicted. Mack's suspected killers left the county and his murder remained unsolved. Marsden's death corresponded with the end of a years-long crime spree. Newspapers suggested that his killing was a service to the community, and for decades, people continued to believe he was behind a gang that committed a long series of unsolved crimes.

== Early life ==
Matthew Marsden's mother enjoyed nicknames for their nine children, and Matthew was called Mack. He was born in a log house where Sandy Creek is joined by Metts Branch, in Jefferson County, Missouri, which borders St. Louis County on the south. The cabin was built by Mack's father, Samuel Marsden, who married Mary Meade Johnston. Samuel built a second, larger home about a mile north, at the head of Metts Branch, and the family moved there. During that time he earned recognition for surveying and graveling the main route to St. Louis, the Lemay Ferry Road. He also was commissioner of the long, red, barn-like covered bridge spanning Sandy Creek, which today is the centerpiece of a state historic site and park. Mack was 17 years old when his mother died. Little is known of his life through his twenties, but about 1878 he joined the throngs of men who set out for the Black Hills of Dakota in search of gold. He had some success, but when there was a dispute over the claim he shared with some other men, resulting in one of them being shot dead, the peace-loving Mack returned to Missouri.

== Marriage ==
About a year after his return to Jefferson County, Mack married a childhood sweetheart, Emma Jean Hensley, daughter of Leander Hensley and Cynthia Ann Williams Hensley. Her family was known for its evangelists and preachers and founded the stalwart Sandy Baptist Church, which has persisted well into the 21st Century. Mack and Emma Jean's only child, Samuel Matthew Marsden, was born in 1879.

== Stock trading business ==
Mack came from a family of lead and tin miners in England, who immigrated to America and were successful in mining at Galena, Illinois, a town named for the ore that produces lead. His grandparents came to Missouri about 1840 after the discovery of lead deposits there. Mack's father Samuel devoted himself to mining and engineering in Jefferson County, but Mack chose to become a livestock trader, dealing in hogs, cattle, and horses, buying them from local farmers and driving them to markets along the Mississippi River on the outskirts of St. Louis.

== Legal problems ==
Mack was first associated with crime in the fall of 1881, when a reclusive farmer, Anson Vail, was found dead in his cabin after it was destroyed by fire. Although there was no evidence of foul play, the sheriff was certain Vail had been murdered. Mack admitted to visiting Vail on business on the evening of his death. He was arrested for the killing in 1882, stood trial, and was acquitted for lack of evidence.

Also beginning in 1881, Jefferson County farmers suffered from a series of livestock thefts, particularly hogs. The sheriff questioned Mack about those thefts, as well as about the murder of prominent merchant Joseph Yerger in the town of Antonia. The local newspaper, The Democrat, repeatedly accused Mack of various crimes, stated he was the leader of a gang of thieves, and labeled him a "desperado". A local vigilante committee even tried to lynch him. Yet in all that time there was no evidence and no witness to tie Marsden to any crime.

In the spring of 1883, Mack was arrested after selling some stolen hogs to a butcher in Carondolet. Although he had a bill of sale to prove he'd bought the hogs, he and several other men were indicted for livestock theft. With their trial approaching, all of the men were out of jail on bond. One of them had turned state's evidence, intending to name Mack as the leader of a gang of thieves. Mack planned to testify similarly against the man who accused him.

== Death ==
On August 29, 1883, Mack was returning from a trip selling livestock in St. Louis with his brother-in-law and constant companion, Allen Hensley. They were riding along the Lemay Ferry Road in Mack's wagon. At a remote location on the route, a group of men stepped into the road and one of them fired a shotgun, killing Marsden with a blast to the head and torso. Hensley was hit with a second blast, but the horse ran away with the wagon, carrying him to safety in the next town, Antonia.

Hensley survived for two days. As he lay dying, he named the men who killed him and Mack. They were finally brought to trial in 1886, but were acquitted. Fearing reprisals, the accused men all moved out of the state. The murders of Mack Marsden and Allen Hensley remained unsolved.

== Mack Marsden in literature ==
Matthew H. Marsden's story is told in The Mack Marsden Murder Mystery: Vigilantism or Justice?, published by the Missouri History Museum in 2011. The narrative history book, by journalist Joe Johnston, is the result of years of research into locations, newspaper accounts, books, and legal records, as well as oral family histories. It details the lives of Mack and many others who were part of his story, and unravels the question of who killed Allen Hensley and Mack Marsden.
