= Regina, Missouri =

Unincorporated community in Missouri, U.S.

Coordinates: 38°19′35″N 90°35′31″W

Regina is an unincorporated community in Jefferson County, in the U.S. state of Missouri.

== History ==
A post office called Regina was established in 1881, and remained in operation until 1905. Regina was the first name of a woman in the neighborhood.
