= Plattin, Missouri =

Unincorporated community in Missouri, U.S.

Coordinates: 38°07′52″N 90°24′41″W

Plattin in October 2026

Plattin is an unincorporated community in southeast Jefferson County, in the U.S. state of Missouri.

The community is located on the west side of the Plattin Creek floodplain approximately six miles south of Festus.

== History ==
A post office called Plattin was established in 1858, and remained in operation until 1941. The community takes its name from nearby Plattin Creek. Plattin has 1 elementary school which is a part of Jefferson County R-VII School District.
