= United Nuclear Corporation =

Former nuclear mining, development, and applications business

UNC Incorporated

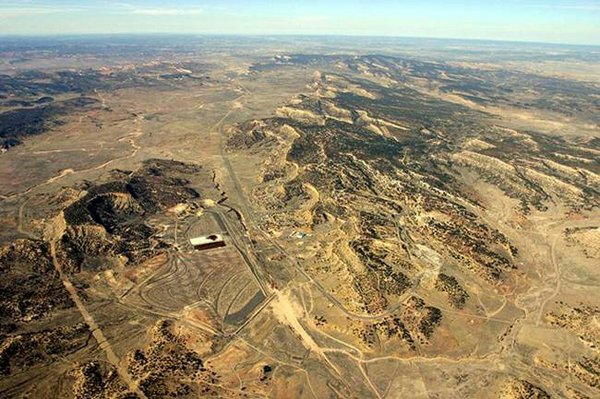
- United Nuclear's uranium mine and mill within the Navajo Nation in Church Rock, New Mexico.
- Formerly: United Nuclear Corporation (1961–1984); UNC Resources Inc (1984 - 1986)
- Type: Public
- Traded as: NYSE: UNC
- Industry: Nuclear mining, research, applications; Aviation services
- Founded: March 1961; 65 years ago in Maryland, United States
- Defunct: September 17, 1997
- Fate: Acquired by General Electric
- Successor: GE ENGINE SERVICES UNC HOLDING I, INC.
- Headquarters: United States
- Area served: United States
- Key people: Dan A. Colussy (Chairperson, President, CEO); John J. Bonasia (Vice Chairperson); Robert L. Pevenstein (Senior Vice President, CFO); Kenneth G. Mosesian (Treasurer)
- Revenue: ▲$832,063,000 (1996)
- Net income: ▲$7,624,000 (1996)
- Total assets: ▲$748,296,000 (1996)
- Total equity: ▲$136,279,000 (1996)
- Number of employees: 7,449 (1996)
- Parent: General Electric
- Divisions: UNC Aviation Services (1984–1996); UNC Naval Products (1961–1976); UNC Development Division (1961–1984); UNC Fuels Division (1961 - 1984)
- Subsidiaries: Gulf United Nuclear Fuels Corporation (1971-1973)

The United Nuclear Corporation (UNC) was a diversified nuclear mining, development, and applications company based out of the United States. Formed in 1961 as a joint venture between the Olin Mathieson Chemical Corporation, the Mallinckrodt Corporation of America, and the Nuclear Development Corporation of America, the company is most well known today as the company behind the Church Rock uranium mill spill. In 1996 the company was acquired by General Electric, and remains to oversee the decommissioning of its former sites.

== History ==
In 1961, the United Nuclear Corporation was formed to oversee the founding partner's existing nuclear projects and profit from the growing nuclear market during the cold war. At formation, UNC began managing the Hematite, Missouri Production Plant and the New Haven Naval Products Plant previously owned by Mallinckrodt and Olin respectively. The company announced the development of a nuclear "fast burst reactor" designed for use in research contexts. Later known as the Health Physics Research Reactor and located in the Oak Ridge National Laboratory, the reactor was completed on 31 May 1963. It was the first of its kind to depart from an unalloyed uranium metal assembly.

In 1963, the company purchased its first uranium mill, Ambrosia Lake. In 1964, it built a nuclear fuel recycling plant. The company experienced its first nuclear accident when technician Robert Peabody, a recycling plant worker, was killed by a criticality incident.

In 1965, UNC won a contract from the Atomic Energy Commission to operate the reactor and fuel fabrication facilities at the AEC's plant. The company also attempted to merge with Pan American Sulphur, however the deal never came to fruition.

The next year, in 1966, Cities Services Co attempted to enter the nuclear market through purchasing UNC, however, yet again, the deal was terminated.

Previously an OTC stock, the company was publicly listed on the New York Stock Exchange in 1968. Later in 1968, Combustion Engineering purchased 22% of UNC despite the majority opposition of the UNC board. In response, UNC brought an antitrust suit against CE. As a result, NE was forced to divest themselves of the company stock.

During the 1970s, the company saw a large expansion. In 1977, it opened its Church Rock uranium mill and moved to a new, larger Naval Products plant in Montville. In 1971, the company expanded into coal mining with the purchase of Plateau Mining. The company also entered a partnership with Gulf Oil to form the Gulf United Nuclear Fuels Corporation, although the company sold its interest to Gulf in 1973. By 1978, the company was the nation's largest independent producer of uranium. The next year, 1979, saw the company's second nuclear incident, when a dam at their Church Rock mine broke, leaking radioactive waste into a tributary of the Puerco River.

In 1984, following the decline of the uranium industry near the end of the cold war, the United Nuclear Corporation rebranded to "UNC" and transitioned over the next decade into a business aviation and jet engine service provider. With the purchase of Garrett Aviation Services in 1996, UNC controlled 52% of the business aviation services market and saw annual revenues of close to $1 billion. The next year, in 1997, General Electric acquired the company and its debts for $330 million, with The Carlyle Group purchasing its military contract services division, UNC Aviation Services.

=== Wood River Critical Accident ===
The accident occurred on July 24, 1964, at a nuclear fuel recovery plant at the United Nuclear Corporation in Wood River Junction, Rhode Island. The plant was designed to recover highly enriched uranium from waste from nuclear fuel production, and only began operation in March of the same year, and had not yet reached full-scale operation at the time of the accident . The day before the accident, the evaporation can for uranium solution concentration was clogged, so I put the uranium solution collected after cleaning work in an elongated container that usually contains a drug called TCE and put a label that said "recovered solution from the evaporation can", but another worker who went to work the next day thought that it contained TCE, and when he transferred it to the adjustment tank, a critical range occurred. Uranium solution did not reach a critical state in an elongated container, but it reached a critical state in a container with a shape that was concentrated in one place. In this accident, one worker died from exposure to more than 450 sieverts. After the accident, the factory manager and the chief on duty were in a critical state again when handling the accident, and were exposed to about 0.5 sieverts.

== Facilities ==
=== Pawling, New York facility ===
United Nuclear Corporation had a facility, located off the Appalachian Trail in Pawling (town), New York, inherited from Nuclear Development Associates, that had a laboratory that experimented with bomb-grade uranium and plutonium. The facility was the site of a glovebox chemical explosion in 1972, that spread plutonium across the lake.

=== Ambrosia Lake Uranium Mill ===
Ambrosia Lake was a uranium mine and mill built in 1957 and operated by the Phillips Petroleum Company until it was purchased by UNC in 1963. Shortly after, UNC ceased milling operations at the site, although they retained ownership of the property.

=== Church Rock Uranium Mill ===
The Church Rock uranium mine and mill, located in McKinley County, New Mexico, first began exploration in 1968 as the company looked to expand its operations to meet demand. The mill was operational from June 1977 to May 1982. At around 5:30am on 16 July 1979, a 20 ft breach opened in the south cell of the facility's uranium mill tailings pond, releasing 1,000 tonnes of solid radioactive mill waste and 93 million US gallons acidic, radioactive tailings solution into Pipeline Arroyo, a tributary of the Puerco River. In 1983 the site was added to the Environmental Protection Agency's the National Priorities List, following investigations and minor cleanup efforts in the previous four years. In 1997, following their purchase by General Electric, the Nuclear Regulatory Commission fined UNC $100,000 for failing to set aside funds for the decommission of the site. In 2008, a five-year plan for the cleanup of contaminated uranium sites on the Navajo reservation, of which Church Rock is part, was authorized.

=== Wood River Junction Fuels Recovery Plant ===
The UNC Fuels Recovery Plant was a nuclear fuel recycling plant opened in April 1964. Four months after it began operation, on 24 July 1964 at 6:06pm a criticality incident occurred resulting in the death of the Production Operator, Robert Peabody, from acute radiation syndrome. Five other employees were in the facility at the time, however no other fatalities occurred. As a result of the incident, the Atomic Energy Commission charged UNC with 14 violations of nuclear safety regulations, however no fines were ever levied against the company. After decontamination, the plant reopened on 1965 and remained in operation until it was decommissioned in 1980. A 1979 aerial survey found radiation exposure rates in the area to be consistent with natural background radiation, except directly over the UNC facility.

=== New Haven & Montville Naval Products Plants ===
UNC operated two facilities for the fabrication of nuclear products for the U.S Navy over its life. The original facility, located in New Haven, Connecticut, was built and operated by Olin Mathieson Chemicals from 1956 until 1961, when the newly formed UNC took over operations. It moved to a new facility in Montville in 1974 and decommissioned the original plant. Following the end of the cold war, the Montville facility was also shut down in 1990, with decontamination being completed in 1994.

=== Hematite, Missouri Production Plant ===
UNC owned and operated the Hematite, Missouri reactor fuel production plant between 1961 and 1971. The facility was inherited from Mallinckrodt, one of three companies making up UNC. During its tenure, the company buried small quantities of uranium on the property; however the company failed to record or disclose specific information about the location, size, or makeup of the burials. In 1971, the facility was sold to the newly formed Gulf United Nuclear Fuels Corporation, a partnership between UNC and Gulf Oil. The site was sold to General Atomics in 1974, and again sold later that year to Combustion Engineering, who repurposed it into an enriched uranium fuel production plant for the U.S Navy.

In 1979 Combustion Engineering applied to decommission the site, however the proposal was rejected because decontamination and disposal activities were not included in the plan. Following this, several surveys were conducted during the 1980s to document the area's radiation exposure. The most notable of these was conducted in 1983 by the Radiation Management Corporation with the goal of discovering the sites Mallinckrodt and UNC had used to dispose of nuclear waste. The report found soil contamination at 40 times higher than the NRC's guidelines allow, and contamination in the ground water 1 to 12 times higher than the EPA allows. Despite this, the survey was unable to identify all burial sites.

The site was purchased in 2000 by the Westinghouse Electric Company and closed the next year. The decontamination and decommissioning of the facility was completed in 2016.
