= Crystal City 47 Public Schools =

School district in Missouri, U.S.

Address
- 1100 Mississippi Ave Crystal City, Jefferson County, 63019; United States
- Coordinates: 38.736701°N 90.395288°W

District information
- Superintendent: Matt Holdinghausen
- Schools: 2
- NCES District ID: 2910380

Students and staff
- Students: 167
- Teachers: 43 (on an FTE basis)
- Staff: 71 (on an FTE basis)
- Student–teacher ratio: 13.74
- District mascot: Hornets
- Colors: Black and red

Other information
- Website: crystal.k12.mo.us

Crystal City 47 Public Schools is a school district headquartered in Crystal City, Missouri in Greater St. Louis. It operates Crystal City Elementary School and Crystal City High School.

== Notable alumni ==
- Bill Bradley, three-term United States Senator representing New Jersey from 1979 to 1997. Graduated from Crystal City High School (1961).
