= Raintree Plantation, Missouri =

- Census-designated place
- Location within Missouri Location within the United States
- Coordinates: 38°15′5″N 90°36′7″W
- Country: United States
- State: Missouri
- County: Jefferson
- Township: Central

Area
  - Total: 2.24 sq mi (5.79 km^{2})
  - Land: 1.95 sq mi (5.06 km^{2})
  - Water: 0.28 sq mi (0.73 km^{2})
- Elevation: 788 ft (240 m)

Population (2020)
  - Total: 1,996
  - Density: 1,022.0/sq mi (394.58/km^{2})
- Time zone: UTC-6 (Central (CST))
  - Summer (DST): UTC-5 (CDT)
- ZIP Code: 63050 (Hillsboro)
- Area code: 636
- FIPS code: 29-60528
- GNIS feature ID: 2806408

Raintree Plantation is an unincorporated community and census-designated place (CDP) in Jefferson County, Missouri, United States. As of the 2020 census, Raintree Plantation had a population of 1,996. It is in the central part of the county, northwest of Hillsboro. It is built around the Raintree Country Club and several artificial lakes, the largest of which is Rain Tree Lake. It is 40 miles (64 km) southwest of St. Louis.

Raintree Plantation was first listed as a CDP prior to the 2020 census.

== Demographics ==
Historical population
Census	Pop.	Note	%±
2020	1,996		—
U.S. Decennial Census

Raintree Plantation first appeared as a census designated place in the 2020 U.S. census.

=== 2020 census ===
As of the 2020 census, Raintree Plantation had a population of 1,996. The median age was 44.1 years. 22.3% of residents were under the age of 18 and 19.6% of residents were 65 years of age or older. For every 100 females there were 95.9 males, and for every 100 females age 18 and over there were 94.1 males age 18 and over.

0.0% of residents lived in urban areas, while 100.0% lived in rural areas.

There were 723 households in Raintree Plantation, of which 28.1% had children under the age of 18 living in them. Of all households, 69.6% were married-couple households, 12.4% were households with a male householder and no spouse or partner present, and 10.8% were households with a female householder and no spouse or partner present. About 16.9% of all households were made up of individuals and 8.3% had someone living alone who was 65 years of age or older.

There were 763 housing units, of which 5.2% were vacant. The homeowner vacancy rate was 0.4% and the rental vacancy rate was 0.0%.

Racial composition as of the 2020 census
Race	Number	Percent
White	1,874	93.9%
Black or African American	5	0.3%
American Indian and Alaska Native	3	0.2%
Asian	13	0.7%
Native Hawaiian and Other Pacific Islander	0	0.0%
Some other race	1	0.1%
Two or more races	100	5.0%
Hispanic or Latino (of any race)	41	2.1%
