= Bushburg, Missouri =

Unincorporated community in Missouri, U.S.

Coordinates: 38°18′19″N 90°22′35″W

Bushburg (formerly spelled Bushberg) is an unincorporated community in Jefferson County, in the U.S. state of Missouri.

== History ==
A post office called Bushberg was established in 1868, and remained in operation until 1904. The community derives its name from Isador Bush, the operator of a local plant nursery.
