= Hematite, Missouri =

Unincorporated community in Missouri, United States

Coordinates: 38°12′07″N 90°28′51″W

Hematite in October 2026

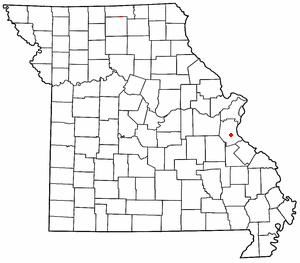
Map of Hematite in Missouri

Hematite (/ˈhɛmətaɪt/ HEM-ə-tyte) is an unincorporated community in eastern Jefferson County, Missouri, United States. It is located on Missouri Route P approximately seven miles northeast of De Soto.

Hematite was platted in 1861. The community was named for nearby deposits of hematite. A post office called Hematite has been in operation since 1858, and the United Nuclear Corporation's reactor fuel production plant operated in the area from 1957 until 2001.
