= Ludwig, Missouri =

Unincorporated community in Missouri, U.S.

Coordinates: 38°14′06″N 90°25′08″W

Ludwig is an unincorporated community in Jefferson County, in the U.S. state of Missouri. The community was named for an individual identified as "Mr. Ludwig," who produced lime in the area.
