= John Gibbs (Virginia politician) =

Lt. John Gibbs was an American settler and member of the Virginia House of Burgesses.

John Gibbs was born in England with a large family and spent some of his life in the country. He arrived on the ship Supply at Jamestown. The Virginia House of Burgesses was the first elected lower house in the legislative assembly in the New World established in the Colony of Virginia in 1619. It would meet once annually in Jamestown, similar to the British Parliament. Over time, the name House of Burgesses came to represent the entire official legislative body of the Colony of Virginia, and later, after the American Revolution, the General Assembly of the Commonwealth of Virginia. Gibbs was a Representative from Captain Warde's Plantation along with Captain John Warde at the first House of Burgesses meeting, in Virginia, held in the choir of the Church of Jamestown.

John Gibbs survived the indian massacre of 1622 and was listed in the 1624 census as a resident of Jordan's Journey, VA.
