= Victoria, Missouri =

Unincorporated community in Missouri, U.S.

Coordinates: 38.17783°N 90.52596°W

Victoria is an unincorporated community in Jefferson County, in the U.S. state of Missouri.

== History ==
Victoria was platted in 1859. A variant name was "Victoria Station". A post office called Victoria Station was established in 1863, the name was changed to Victoria in 1885, and the post office closed in 1955.
