= Olympian Village, Missouri =

- City
- Location of Olympian Village, Missouri
- Coordinates: 38°08′05″N 90°27′29″W
- Country: United States
- State: Missouri
- County: Jefferson

Area
  - Total: 0.52 sq mi (1.35 km^{2})
  - Land: 0.52 sq mi (1.35 km^{2})
  - Water: 0 sq mi (0.00 km^{2})
- Elevation: 666 ft (203 m)

Population (2020)
  - Total: 719
  - Density: 1,380.3/sq mi (532.93/km^{2})
- Time zone: UTC-6 (Central (CST))
  - Summer (DST): UTC-5 (CDT)
- ZIP code: 63020
- Area code: 636
- FIPS code: 29-54686
- GNIS feature ID: 2396063

Olympian Village is a city in Jefferson County, Missouri, United States. As of the 2020 census, Olympian Village had a population of 719. The city was named in honor of Greek myth and culture. Some street names include Parthenon Drive, Kronos Drive, Hercules Place, Plato Place, and Pheidippides Place.

== Geography ==
According to the United States Census Bureau, the city has a total area of 0.57 square miles (1.48 km^{2}), all land.

== Government ==
Olympian Village is a fourth class city incorporated in 1965, which consists primarily of a single subdivision of single-family homes built in the 1960s.

== Public safety ==
Olympian Village is serviced by the part paid, part volunteer, Hematite Fire Protection District which operates a station nearby, about halfway between Olympian Village and nearby Festus. Olympian Village was served by its own police department, which was a volunteer program until 2005, when state and federal grants allowed for a full-time, paid police department. In 2009, local officials disbanded the department due to a lack of funding. Service resumed in 2010 in the form of another volunteer police department, where officers worked without pay. Joachim-Plattin Ambulance District operates station 4 in Olympian Village which is staffed 24 hours per day, year-round.

== Demographics ==
Historical population
Census	Pop.	Note	%±
1970	399		—
1980	774		94.0%
1990	752		−2.8%
2000	669		−11.0%
2010	774		15.7%
2020	719		−7.1%
U.S. Decennial Census

=== 2010 census ===
As of the census of 2010, there were 719 people, 246 households, and 201 families living in the city. The population density was 1,357.9 inhabitants per square mile (524.3/km^{2}). There were 264 housing units at an average density of 463.2 per square mile (178.8/km^{2}). The racial makeup of the city was 97.3% White, 0.4% African American, 0.3% Native American, 0.5% Asian, 0.4% from other races, and 1.2% from two or more races. Hispanic or Latino of any race were 1.6% of the population.

There were 246 households, of which 49.6% had children under the age of 18 living with them, 54.5% were married couples living together, 20.7% had a female householder with no husband present, 6.5% had a male householder with no wife present, and 18.3% were non-families. 13.0% of all households were made up of individuals, and 4% had someone living alone who was 65 years of age or older. The average household size was 3.15 and the average family size was 3.27.

The median age in the city was 32.2 years. 30.9% of residents were under the age of 18; 9.3% were between the ages of 18 and 24; 28.6% were from 25 to 44; 25.3% were from 45 to 64; and 5.8% were 65 years of age or older. The gender makeup of the city was 47.8% male and 52.2% female.

=== 2000 census ===
As of the census of 2000, there were 669 people, 217 households, and 182 families living in the city. The population density was 1,190.1 inhabitants per square mile (459.5/km^{2}). There were 232 housing units at an average density of 412.7 per square mile (159.3/km^{2}). The racial makeup of the city was 97.61% White, 0.30% Native American, 1.49% Asian, and 0.60% from two or more races. Hispanic or Latino of any race were 0.60% of the population.

There were 217 households, out of which 43.8% had children under the age of 18 living with them, 64.1% were married couples living together, 12.4% had a female householder with no husband present, and 16.1% were non-families. 12.0% of all households were made up of individuals, and 4.1% had someone living alone who was 65 years of age or older. The average household size was 3.08 and the average family size was 3.30.

In the city, the population was spread out, with 29.6% under the age of 18, 10.8% from 18 to 24, 33.3% from 25 to 44, 20.0% from 45 to 64, and 6.3% who were 65 years of age or older. The median age was 30 years. For every 100 females, there were 97.9 males. For every 100 females age 18 and over, there were 103.0 males.

The median income for a household in the city was $41,447, and the median income for a family was $43,438. Males had a median income of $30,694 versus $19,514 for females. The per capita income for the city was $14,928. About 9.3% of families and 10.2% of the population were below the poverty line, including 10.5% of those under age 18 and none of those age 65 or over.
