= Meramec Heights, Missouri =

Unincorporated Community in Missouri, U.S.

Coordinates: 38°27′21″N 90°26′24″W

Meramec Heights is a locally designated name located on the intersection of Highway 21 and East/West Rock Creek. Meramec Heights does not have its own post office. All residents residing on the east side of 21 have an Arnold, Missouri address, and all residents residing on the west side of 21 have an Imperial, Missouri address.

== Education ==
Meramec Heights Elementary School is located in the vicinity at 1340 W Outer 21 Rd, Arnold, MO 63010. It is part of the Fox C-6 School District. According to a recent U.S. News & World Report webpage Meramec Heights Elementary serves 400 students in grades K through 5.
