= High Ridge, Maryland =

Unincorporated community in Maryland, U.S.

Coordinates: 39°07′05″N 76°51′31″W

High Ridge is an unincorporated community in Howard County, Maryland, United States. A postal stop operated from May 25, 1892, through December 1895 and until May 1899 as "Highridge".

The community is roughly bounded by the Patuxent River boundary between Howard and Prince George's County, Maryland Route 216, and Interstate 95. The modern community is mostly residential, with the installation of high-tension power lines and infill development leading local concerns.
