= High Ridge Township, Jefferson County, Missouri =

Township in Jefferson County, Missouri, U.S.

High Ridge Township
- Inactive Township
- Interactive map of High Ridge Township
- Coordinates: 38.4°N 90.6°W
- Country: United States of America
- State: Missouri
- County: Jefferson

Area
  - Total: 37.0 sq mi (96 km^{2})

Population (2020)
  - Total: 19,152
  - Density: 518/sq mi (200/km^{2})
- GNIS feature ID: 2397813

High Ridge Township is a township in Jefferson County, Missouri.

The township was so named on account of its lofty elevation.
