= Big River Township, Jefferson County, Missouri =

Inactive township in the US state of Missouri

Big River Township
- Inactive Township
- Interactive map of Big River Township
- Coordinates: 38.2°N 90.7°W
- Country: United States of America
- State: Missouri
- County: Jefferson

Area
  - Total: 95.0 sq mi (246 km^{2})

Population (2020)
  - Total: 6,137
  - Density: 64.6/sq mi (24.9/km^{2})
- GNIS feature ID: 766822

Big River Township is an inactive township in Jefferson County, in the U.S. state of Missouri.

Big River Township takes its name from Big River.
