= Crystal City High School (Missouri) =

Public high school in Missouri, US

Coordinates: 38.2312°N 90.3780°W

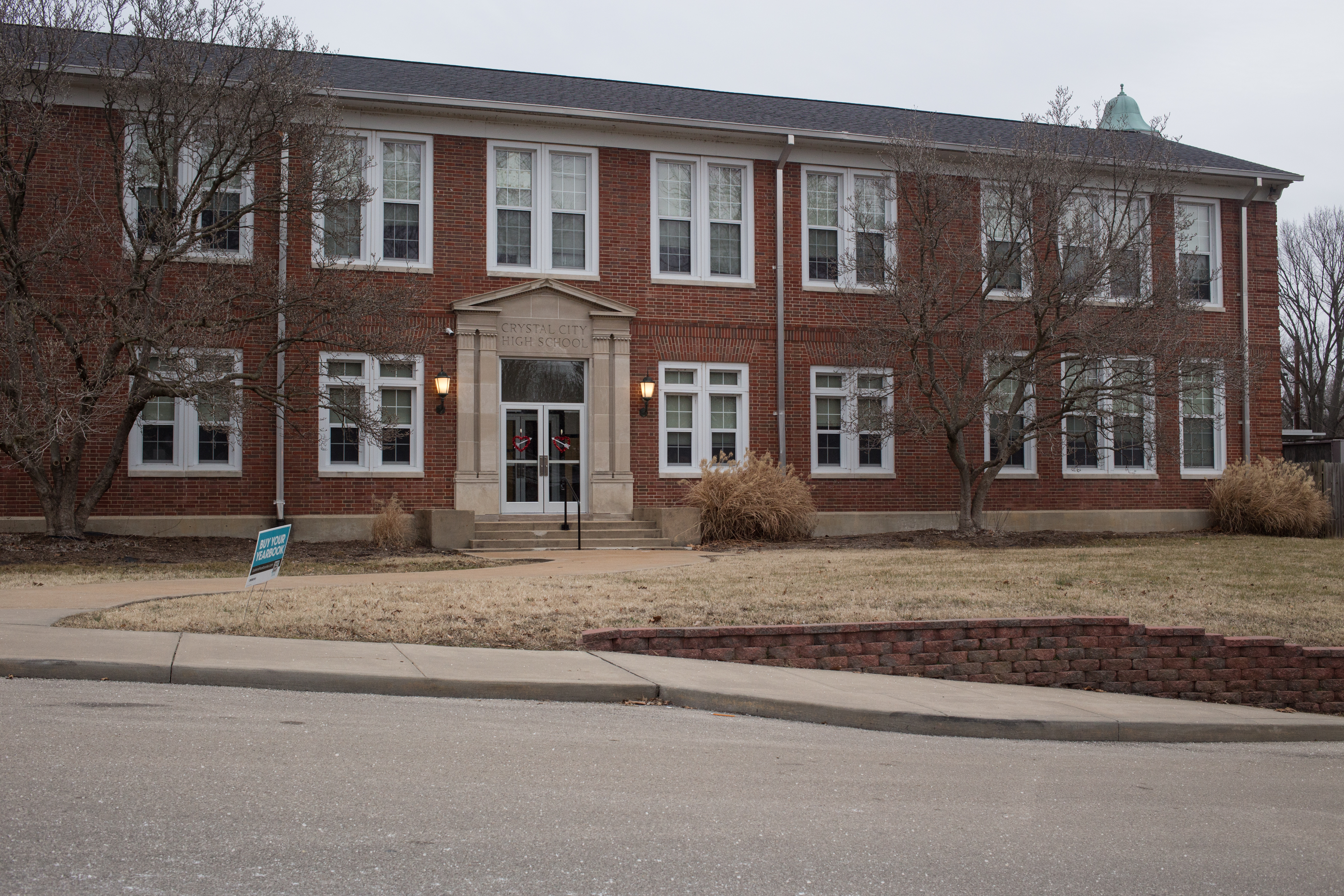
- 1100 Mississippi Ave; Crystal City, Missouri 63019; United States

Information
- Type: Public High School
- School district: Crystal City 47 Public Schools
- Teaching staff: 19.90 (on an FTE basis)
- Grades: 7–12
- Enrollment: 238 (2024-2025)
- Student to teacher ratio: 11.96
- Colors: Black and red
- Athletics conference: MSHSAA
- Sports: Track, Cross Country, Volleyball, Baseball, Basketball, Softball, Football, Golf, Tennis, Cheerleading
- Mascot: Hornets
- Website: crystalcchs.ss4.sharpschool.com

Crystal City High School is a high school in Crystal City, Missouri, and the only high school in Crystal City 47 Public Schools.

== Overview ==
The high school has 161 students with a student to teacher ratio of 12:1. The average ACT score is 20.8. 88% of students graduate high school and 79% go to college after graduating. In 2017, Crystal City High's football field flooded due to being on the flood plains of the Mississippi River. This was not the first time the football field has flooded, 2015 being the last major flood in the area. Bill Bradley announced his intent to run for President in the United States presidential election of 2000 at Crystal City High's gymnasium.

As of 2019 the student body was 94% White and 6% African-American.

== Notable alumni ==
- Bill Bradley: NBA Player and three term Democratic U.S. Senator from New Jersey and ran unsuccessfully for the Democratic Party’s presidential nomination for the 2000 presidential elections.
- Jim Jennings: former NFL player (Green Bay Packers)
