= Jefferson County, Missouri =

County in Missouri, United States

- County
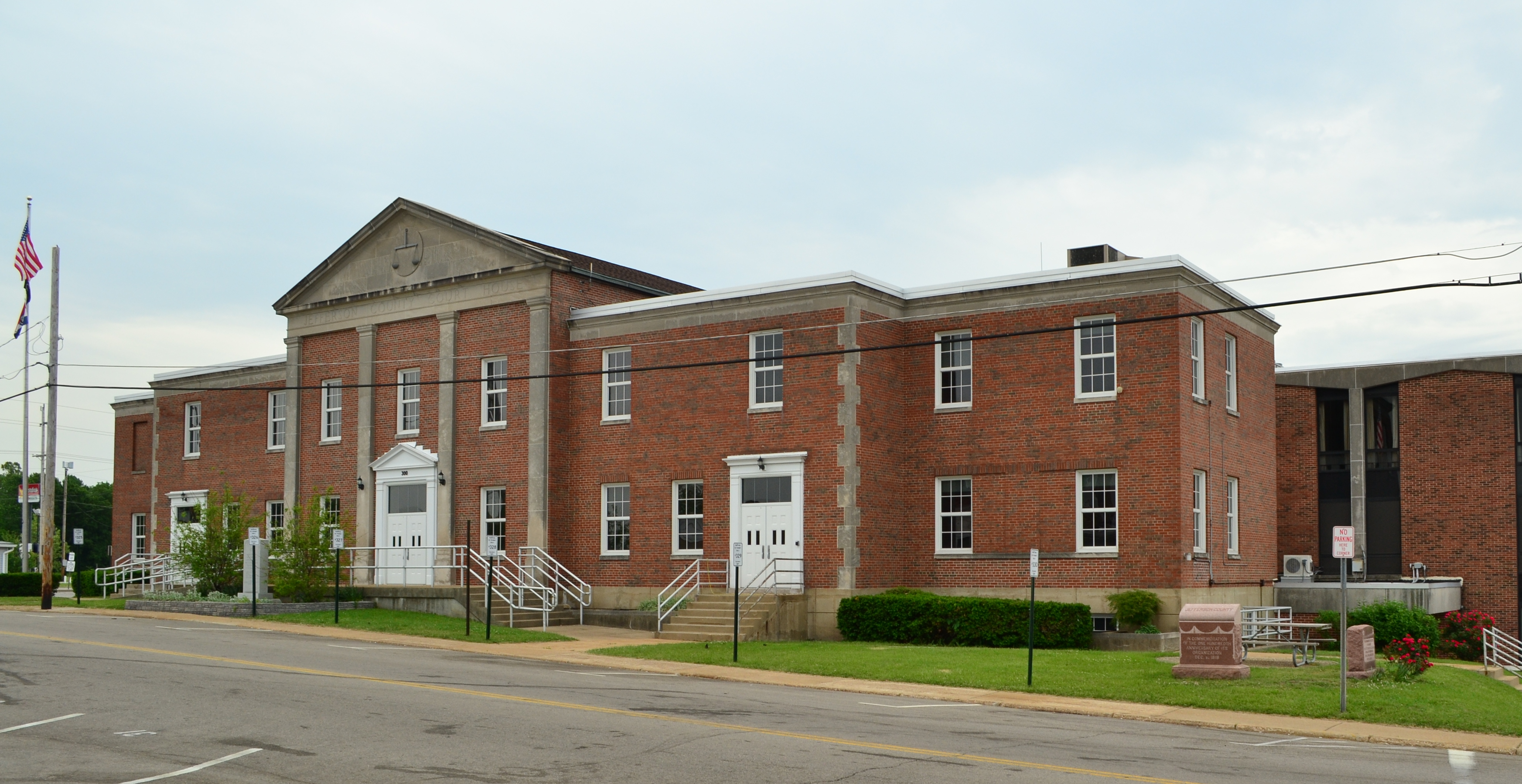
- The Jefferson County Courthouse in Hillsboro

- Seal

- Location within the U.S. state of Missouri
- Coordinates: 38°16′N 90°32′W
- Country: United States
- State: Missouri
- Founded: 1818
- Named for: Thomas Jefferson
- Seat: Hillsboro
- Largest city: Arnold

Area
  - Total: 664 sq mi (1,720 km^{2})
  - Land: 657 sq mi (1,700 km^{2})
  - Water: 7.7 sq mi (20 km^{2}) 1.2%

Population (2020)
  - Total: 226,739
  - Estimate (2025): 233,132 ▲
  - Density: 345/sq mi (133/km^{2})
- Time zone: UTC−6 (Central)
  - Summer (DST): UTC−5 (CDT)
- Congressional districts: 3rd, 8th
- Website: www.jeffcomo.gov

Jefferson County is located in the eastern portion of the U.S. state of Missouri. It is a part of the St. Louis Metropolitan Area. As of the 2020 census, the population was 226,739, making it the sixth-most populous county in Missouri. Its county seat is Hillsboro. The county was organized in 1818 and named in honor of former president Thomas Jefferson. In 1980, according to the U.S. census held that year, the county contained the mean center of U.S. population. Notably, this was the first census in which the center of population was west of the Mississippi River. Jefferson County is part of the St. Louis Metropolitan Statistical Area and encompasses many of the city's southern suburbs.

== Geography ==
According to the U.S. Census Bureau, the county has a total area of 664 square miles (1,720 km^{2}), of which 657 square miles (1,700 km^{2}) is land and 7.7 square miles (20 km^{2}) (1.2%) is water. The county's eastern border is the Mississippi River.

=== Adjacent counties ===
- St. Louis County (north)
- Monroe County, Illinois (east)
- Ste. Genevieve County (southeast)
- St. Francois County (south)
- Washington County (southwest)
- Franklin County (west)

=== Major highways ===
- I-55
- Route 21
- Route 30
- Route 109
- Route 110
- Route 141
- Route 231

=== National protected area ===
- Middle Mississippi River National Wildlife Refuge (part)

== Demographics ==
Historical population
Census	Pop.	Note	%±
1820	1,835		—
1830	2,592		41.3%
1840	4,296		65.7%
1850	6,928		61.3%
1860	10,344		49.3%
1870	15,380		48.7%
1880	18,736		21.8%
1890	22,484		20.0%
1900	25,712		14.4%
1910	27,878		8.4%
1920	26,555		−4.7%
1930	27,563		3.8%
1940	32,023		16.2%
1950	38,007		18.7%
1960	66,377		74.6%
1970	105,248		58.6%
1980	146,183		38.9%
1990	171,380		17.2%
2000	198,099		15.6%
2010	218,733		10.4%
2020	226,739		3.7%
2025 (est.)	233,132	▲	2.8%
U.S. Decennial Census; 1790-1960 1900-1990; 1990-2000 2010-2019

=== 2020 census ===
As of the 2020 census, the county had a population of 226,739 and a median age of 40.3 years. 23.1% of residents were under the age of 18 and 16.2% of residents were 65 years of age or older. For every 100 females there were 99.1 males, and for every 100 females age 18 and over there were 97.1 males age 18 and over.

The racial makeup of the county was 90.4% White, 1.0% Black or African American, 0.3% American Indian and Alaska Native, 0.8% Asian, 0.0% Native Hawaiian and Pacific Islander, 0.8% from some other race, and 6.6% from two or more races. Hispanic or Latino residents of any race comprised 2.4% of the population.

65.2% of residents lived in urban areas, while 34.8% lived in rural areas.

There were 86,959 households in the county, of which 32.4% had children under the age of 18 living with them and 21.7% had a female householder with no spouse or partner present. About 22.9% of all households were made up of individuals and 9.7% had someone living alone who was 65 years of age or older.

There were 92,385 housing units, of which 5.9% were vacant. Among occupied housing units, 80.5% were owner-occupied and 19.5% were renter-occupied. The homeowner vacancy rate was 1.3% and the rental vacancy rate was 7.9%.

=== Racial and ethnic composition ===
Jefferson County, Missouri – Racial and ethnic composition Note: the US Census treats Hispanic/Latino as an ethnic category. This table excludes Latinos from the racial categories and assigns them to a separate category. Hispanics/Latinos may be of any race.
Race / Ethnicity (NH = Non-Hispanic)	Pop 1980	Pop 1990	Pop 2000	Pop 2010	Pop 2020	% 1980	% 1990	% 2000	% 2010	% 2020
White alone (NH)	143,652	168,071	191,753	208,742	203,287	98.27%	98.07%	96.80%	95.43%	89.66%
Black or African American alone (NH)	952	1,188	1,340	1,776	2,295	0.65%	0.69%	0.68%	0.81%	1.01%
Native American or Alaska Native alone (NH)	284	407	543	608	617	0.19%	0.24%	0.27%	0.28%	0.27%
Asian alone (NH)	250	526	691	1,403	1,839	0.17%	0.31%	0.35%	0.64%	0.81%
Native Hawaiian or Pacific Islander alone (NH)	x	x	27	48	71	x	x	0.01%	0.02%	0.03%
Other race alone (NH)	114	37	79	120	622	0.08%	0.02%	0.04%	0.05%	0.27%
Mixed race or Multiracial (NH)	x	x	1,664	2,628	12,456	x	x	0.84%	1.20%	5.49%
Hispanic or Latino (any race)	931	1,151	2,002	3,408	5,552	0.64%	0.67%	1.01%	1.56%	2.45%
Total	146,183	171,380	198,099	218,733	226,739	100.00%	100.00%	100.00%	100.00%	100.00%

=== 2010 census ===
As of the 2010 census, Jefferson County had a population of 218,733. The reported ethnic and racial make up of the population was 95.4% non-Hispanic white, 0.8% African-American, 0.3% Native American, 0.6% Asian, 0.4% reporting some other race, 1.3% reporting two or more races and 1.6% Hispanic or Latino of any race.

=== 2000 census ===
As of the census of 2000, there were 198,099 people, 71,499 households, and 54,553 families residing in the county. The population density was 302 inhabitants per square mile (117/km^{2}). There were 75,586 housing units at an average density of 115 units per square mile (44/km^{2}). The racial makeup of the county was 97.48% White, 0.68% Black or African American, 0.29% Native American, 0.36% Asian, 0.01% Pacific Islander, 0.24% from other races, and 0.93% from two or more races. Approximately 1.01% of the population were Hispanic or Latino of any race.

There were 71,499 households, out of which 38.90% had children under the age of 18 living with them, 61.00% were married couples living together, 10.40% had a female householder with no husband present, and 23.70% were non-families. 18.90% of all households were made up of individuals, and 6.10% had someone living alone who was 65 years of age or older. The average household size was 2.74 and the average family size was 3.12.

In the county, the population was spread out, with 27.90% under the age of 18, 8.50% from 18 to 24, 31.80% from 25 to 44, 22.50% from 45 to 64, and 9.20% who were 65 years of age or older. The median age was 35 years. For every 100 females there were 98.90 males. For every 100 females age 18 and over, there were 95.90 males.

The median income for a household in the county was $60,636, and the median income for a family was $66,697. Males had a median income of $37,822 versus $25,440 for females. The per capita income for the county was $25,058. About 4.90% of families and 6.80% of the population were below the poverty line, including 8.10% of those under age 18 and 6.30% of those age 65 or over.

There were 146,316 registered voters in 2008. As of October 24, 2012, there were 148,011.

== Education ==
K-12 school districts with territory in the county, no matter how slight, include:

- Crystal City 47 Public Schools
- De Soto 73 School District
- Dunklin R-V School District
- Festus R-VI School District
- Fox C-6 School District
- Grandview R-II School District
- Hillsboro R-3 School District
- Kingston K-14 School District
- North St. Francis County R-I School District
- Northwest R-I School District
- Meramec Valley School District
- Rockwood School District
- Windsor C-1 School District

Additionally, there are two elementary school districts: Jefferson County R-VII School District and Sunrise R-IX School District.

=== Public schools ===
- Crystal City 47 Public Schools - Crystal City
  - Crystal City High School - Crystal City
- De Soto School District 73 - De Soto
  - Early Childhood Center (PK)
  - Athena Elementary School (K-06)
  - Vineland Elementary School (K-06)
  - De Soto Jr. High School (07-08)
  - De Soto High School (09-12)
- Dunklin R-V School District - Herculaneum
- Festus R-VI School District - Festus
  - Festus Elementary School (K-03)
  - Festus Intermediate School (04-06)
  - Festus Middle School (07-08)
  - Festus High School (09-12)
- Fox C-6 School District - Arnold
- Grandview R-II School District - Hillsboro
  - Grandview Elementary School (K-05) - Hillsboro
  - Grandview Middle School (06-08) - Hillsboro
  - Grandview High School (09-12) - Ware
- Hillsboro R-3 School District - Hillsboro
  - Hillsboro Primary School (PK-01)
  - Hillsboro Elementary School (02-03)
  - Hillsboro Intermediate School (04-06)
  - Hillsboro Jr. High School (07-08)
  - Hillsboro High School (09-12)
- Jefferson County R-VII School District - Festus
  - Plattin Primary School (PK-02) - Plattin
  - Telegraph Intermediate School (03-05) - Festus
  - Danby-Rush Tower Middle School (06-08) - Festus
  - Jefferson High School- Festus
- Northwest R-I School District - High Ridge
  - Brennan Woods Elementary School (K-05) - High Ridge
  - Cedar Springs Elementary School (K-05) - House Springs
  - High Ridge Elementary School (K-05) - High Ridge
  - House Springs Elementary School (K-05) - House Springs
  - Maple Grove Elementary School (K-05) - Dittmer
  - Murphy Elementary School (K-05) - High Ridge
  - Woodridge Middle School (06-08) - High Ridge
  - Valley Middle School (06-08) - House Springs
  - Northwest High School (09-12) - Cedar Hill
- Sunrise R-IX School District - De Soto
  - Sunrise Elementary School (K-08) - De Soto
- Windsor C-1 School District - Imperial

=== Private schools ===
- Christian Outreach School (K-12) - Hillsboro - Nondenominational Christian
- People's Christian Academy (K-12) - Arnold - Assembly of God/Pentecostal
- St. Pius X High School (9-12) - Crystal City - Roman Catholic
- Twin City Christian Academy (PK-12) - Festus - Baptist
- Good Shepherd Catholic School - (K-08) - Hillsboro - Roman Catholic
- Holy Child Elementary & Middle School - Arnold - (K-08) - Roman Catholic
- Manna Christian Academy - De Soto - (K-12) - Southern Baptist
- Our Lady's Catholic School - Festus - (K-08) - Roman Catholic
- Sacred Heart Catholic School - Festus - (K-08) - Roman Catholic
- St. Anthony's Catholic School - High Ridge - (K-08) - Roman Catholic
- St. Joseph's Catholic School - Imperial - (K-08) - Roman Catholic
- St. Johns Lutheran School - Arnold - (PK-08) - Lutheran
- St. Johns School - Imperial - (K-08) - Nondenominational Christianity
- St. Rose of Lima Catholic School - De Soto - (K-08) - Roman Catholic

=== Postsecondary ===
Jefferson College - Hillsboro: A public, two-year community college

=== Public libraries ===
- Crystal City Public Library
- De Soto Public Library
- Festus Public Library
- Herculaneum Public Library
- Jefferson County Public Library

== Politics ==
=== Local ===
Historically, the Democratic Party has controlled politics at the local level; starting in 2010 the Republican Party has flipped the county with 66% of the population voting Republican in 2020.

Jefferson County, Missouri

Elected countywide officials
Assessor	Robert Boyer	Republican
Auditor	Kristy Apprill	Republican
Circuit Clerk	Michael Reuter	Republican
County Clerk	Jeannie Goff	Republican
County Executive	Dennis Gannon	Republican
Collector	Michelle Worth	Republican
Prosecuting Attorney	Trisha Stefanski	Republican
Public Administrator	Tracey Perry	Republican
Recorder	Debbie Dunnegan	Republican
Sheriff	Dave Marshak	Republican
Treasurer	Paula Wagner	Republican

=== State ===
Jefferson County is divided into seven legislative districts in the Missouri House of Representatives; all of which are held by Republicans. Jefferson County consists of two State Senate Districts.

Missouri House of Representatives — District 97 — Jefferson County (2020)
Party	Candidate	Votes	%	±%
Republican	Mary Elizabeth Coleman	13,260	100%	

Missouri House of Representatives — District 97 — Jefferson County (2018)
Party	Candidate	Votes	%	±%
Republican	Mary Elizabeth Coleman	7,204	56.40%	
Democratic	Mike Revis	5,570	43.60%	

Missouri House of Representatives — District 97 — Jefferson County (2016)
Party	Candidate	Votes	%	±%
Republican	John C. McCaherty	10,386	74.00%	+7.02
Libertarian	Tracy J. Scott	3,650	26.00%	+26.00

Missouri House of Representatives — District 97 — Jefferson County (2014)
Party	Candidate	Votes	%	±%
Republican	John C. McCaherty	4,681	66.98%	+15.83
Democratic	Tom Dohack	2,308	33.02%	−15.83

Past gubernatorial elections results
Year	Republican	Democratic	Third Parties
2024	66.98% 78,385	30.55% 35,753	2.47% 2,896
2020	63.91% 73,942	33.59% 38,866	2.50% 2,886
2016	53.62% 56.755	42.74% 45.234	3.64% 3,848
2012	41.75% 40,470	55.68% 53,971	2.56% 2,484
2008	34.42% 35,947	63.87% 66,697	1.71% 1,781
2004	49.23% 45,891	49.25% 45,909	1.52% 1,424
2000	47.05% 36,060	49.33% 37,808	3.62% 2,775
1996	43.90% 28,986	52.96% 34,970	3.14% 2,077

Missouri House of Representatives — District 97 — Jefferson County (2012)
Party	Candidate	Votes	%	±%
Republican	John C. McCaherty	6,946	51.15%	
Democratic	Sam Komo	6,633	48.85%	

- District 111 Shane Roden (R-Cedar Hill). Consists of Byrnes Mill, Cedar Hill, Cedar Hill Lakes, House Springs, and Scottsdale.

Missouri House of Representatives — District 111 — Jefferson County (2020)
Party	Candidate	Votes	%	±%
Republican	Shane Roden	13,308	70.87%	
Democratic	Daniel (Vern) Cherry	5,470	29.13%	

Missouri House of Representatives — District 111 — Jefferson County (2018)
Party	Candidate	Votes	%	±%
Republican	Shane Roden	9,826	65.34%	
Democratic	Phoebe Ottomeyer	5,212	34.66%	

Missouri House of Representatives — District 111 — Jefferson County (2016)
Party	Candidate	Votes	%	±%
Republican	Shane Roden	10,699	62.10%	+9.12
Democratic	Del Viehland	5,020	29.14%	−17.88
Independent	Jon Schuesller	1,510	8.76%	+8.76

Missouri House of Representatives — District 111 — Jefferson County (2014)
Party	Candidate	Votes	%	±%
Republican	Shane Roden	4,834	52.98%	+3.66
Democratic	Michael Frame	4,291	47.02%	−3.66

Missouri House of Representatives — District 111 — Jefferson County (2012)
Party	Candidate	Votes	%	±%
Democratic	Michael Frame	8,052	50.68%	
Republican	Derrick Good	7,836	49.32%	

- District 112 Rob Vescovo (R-Arnold). Consists of areas near Arnold and Byrnes Mill.

Missouri House of Representatives — District 112 — Jefferson County (2020)
Party	Candidate	Votes	%	±%
Republican	Rob Vescovo	16,545	100%	

Missouri House of Representatives — District 112 — Jefferson County (2018)
Party	Candidate	Votes	%	±%
Republican	Rob Vescovo	16,545	61.30%	
Democratic	Benjamin Hagin	6,074	38.70%	

Missouri House of Representatives — District 112 — Jefferson County (2016)
Party	Candidate	Votes	%	±%
Republican	Rob Vescovo	10,754	59.64%	−0.43
Democratic	Robert Butler	7,278	40.36%	+0.43

Missouri House of Representatives — District 112 — Jefferson County (2014)
Party	Candidate	Votes	%	±%
Republican	Rob Vescovo	5,432	60.07%	+0.97
Democratic	Robert Butler	3,611	39.93%	−0.97

Missouri House of Representatives — District 112 — Jefferson County (2012)
Party	Candidate	Votes	%	±%
Republican	Paul Wieland	9,284	59.10%	
Democratic	Daniel James	6,425	40.90%	

- District 113 Dan Shaul (R-Imperial). Consists of most Arnold, all of Imperial and Kimmswick, and part of Barnhart.

Missouri House of Representatives — District 113 — Jefferson County (2020)
Party	Candidate	Votes	%	±%
Republican	Dan Shaul	11,150	63.19%	
Democratic	Terry Burgess	6,519	36.90%	

Missouri House of Representatives — District 113 — Jefferson County (2018)
Party	Candidate	Votes	%	±%
Republican	Dan Shaul	7,940	56.52%	
Democratic	Karen Settlemoir-Berg	6,109	43.48%	

Missouri House of Representatives — District 113 — Jefferson County (2016)
Party	Candidate	Votes	%	±%
Republican	Dan Shaul	9,598	57.84%	−2.14
Democratic	Karen Settlemoir-Berg	6,995	42.16%	+2.14

Missouri House of Representatives — District 113 — Jefferson County (2014)
Party	Candidate	Votes	%	±%
Republican	Dan Shaul	4,749	59.98%	+13.21
Democratic	Sean Fauss	3,168	40.02%	−13.21

Missouri House of Representatives — District 113 — Jefferson County (2012)
Party	Candidate	Votes	%	±%
Democratic	Jeff Roorda	8,450	53.23%	
Republican	Dan Smith	7,225	46.77%	

- District 114 Becky Ruth (R-Festus). Consists of part of Barnhart, and all of Crystal City, Festus, Herculaneum, and Pevely.

Missouri House of Representatives — District 114 — Jefferson County (2020)
Party	Candidate	Votes	%	±%
Republican	Becky Ruth	15,798	100.00%	

Missouri House of Representatives — District 114 — Jefferson County (2018)
Party	Candidate	Votes	%	±%
Republican	Becky Ruth	9,664	67.64%	
Democratic	Dennis McDonald	4,624	32.36%	

Missouri House of Representatives — District 114 — Jefferson County (2016)
Party	Candidate	Votes	%	±%
Republican	Becky Ruth	14,639	100.00%	+46.74%

Missouri House of Representatives — District 114 — Jefferson County (2014)
Party	Candidate	Votes	%	±%
Republican	Becky Ruth	4,791	53.26%	+3.53
Democratic	T. J. McKenna	4,204	46.74%	−3.53

Missouri House of Representatives — District 114 — Jefferson County (2012)
Party	Candidate	Votes	%	±%
Democratic	T. J. McKenna	7,772	50.27%	
Republican	Becky Ruth	7,688	49.73%	

- District 115 Cyndi Buchheit-Courtway (R-Festus). Consists of Olympian Village and areas near De Soto.

Missouri House of Representatives — District 115 — Jefferson County (2020)
Party	Candidate	Votes	%	±%
Republican	Cyndi Buchheit Courtway	6,444	69.32%	+5.68
Democratic	Cynthia Nugent	2,835	27.97%	

Missouri House of Representatives — District 115 — Jefferson County (2018)
Party	Candidate	Votes	%	±%
Republican	Elaine Freeman Gannon	6,671	100%	

Missouri House of Representatives — District 115 — Jefferson County (2016)
Party	Candidate	Votes	%	±%
Republican	Elaine Gannon	6,444	69.32%	+5.68
Democratic	Barbara Stocker	2,443	26.28%	−5.12
Libertarian	Charles Bigelow	409	4.40%	+4.40

Missouri House of Representatives — District 115 — Jefferson County (2014)
Party	Candidate	Votes	%	±%
Republican	Elaine Gannon	3,285	63.64%	+12.75
Democratic	Dan Darian	1,621	31.40%	−17.71
Constitution	Jerry Dollar, Jr.	256	4.96%	+4.96

Missouri House of Representatives — District 115 — Jefferson County (2012)
Party	Candidate	Votes	%	±%
Republican	Elaine Gannon	4,329	50.89%	
Democratic	Rich McCane	4,177	49.11%	

- District 118 Mike McGirl (R-Potosi). Consists of De Soto and Hillsboro.

Missouri House of Representatives — District 118 — Jefferson County (2020)
Party	Candidate	Votes	%	±%
Republican	Mike McGirl	9,259	100.00%	

Missouri House of Representatives — District 118 — Jefferson County (2018)
Party	Candidate	Votes	%	±%
Republican	Mike McGirl	5,336	62.19%	
Democratic	Barbara Marco	3,244	37.81%	

Missouri House of Representatives — District 118 — Jefferson County (2016)
Party	Candidate	Votes	%	±%
Democratic	Ben Harris	8,164	100.00%	+44.57

Missouri House of Representatives — District 118 — Jefferson County (2014)
Party	Candidate	Votes	%	±%
Democratic	Ben Harris	3,239	55.43%	−44.57
Republican	Michael McGirl	2,604	44.57%	+44.57

Missouri House of Representatives — District 118 — Jefferson County (2012)
Party	Candidate	Votes	%	±%
Democratic	Ben Harris	7,514	100.00%	

Jefferson County is also divided into two districts in the Missouri Senate.

- District 3 — Elaine Gannon (R-De Soto) Consists of De Soto, Hillsboro, and Olympian Village as well as part of Festus.

Missouri Senate — District 3 — Jefferson County (2020)
Party	Candidate	Votes	%	±%
Republican	Elaine Freeman Gannon	20,578	100%	
Green	Edward Weissler	4,681	22.24%	+22.24

Missouri Senate — District 3 — Jefferson County (2016)
Party	Candidate	Votes	%	±%
Republican	Gary Romine	16,356	77.75%	+27.90
Green	Edward Weissler	4,681	22.24%	+22.24

Missouri Senate — District 3 — Jefferson County (2012)
Party	Candidate	Votes	%	±%
Republican	Gary Romine	10,069	49.85	
Democratic	Joseph Fallert, Jr.	10,129	50.15	

- District 22 — Paul Wieland (R-Imperial) Consists of the northern part of the county.

Missouri Senate — District 22 — Jefferson County (2018)
Party	Candidate	Votes	%	±%
Republican	Paul Wieland	40,556	58.32	
Democratic	Robert Butler	26.903	38.69	
Libertarian	Richie Camden	2,078	2.99	

Missouri Senate — District 22 — Jefferson County (2014)
Party	Candidate	Votes	%	±%
Republican	Paul Wieland	22,208	54.19	
Democratic	Jeff Roorda	18,774	45.81	

=== Federal ===
U.S. Senate — Missouri — (2018)
Party	Candidate	Votes	%	±%
Republican	Josh Hawley	49,142	54.33%	
Democratic	Claire McCaskill	37,915	41.92%	
Independent	Craig O'Dear	1,550	1.71%	
Libertarian	Japheth Campbell	1,207	1.33%	
Green	Jo Crain	633	0.70%	

U.S. Senate — Missouri — (2016)
Party	Candidate	Votes	%	±%
Republican	Roy Blunt	53,218	50.34%	+10.37
Democratic	Jason Kander	46,975	44.44%	−9.07
Libertarian	Jonathan Dine	2,941	2.78%	−3.74
Green	Johnathan McFarland	1,450	1.37%	+1.37
Constitution	Fred Ryman	1,124	1.06%	+1.06

U.S. Senate — Missouri — (2012)
Party	Candidate	Votes	%	±%
Democratic	Claire McCaskill	51,862	53.51%	
Republican	Todd Akin	38,745	39.97%	
Libertarian	Jonathan Dine	6,316	6.52%	

Jefferson County is divided among three congressional districts. Prior to the 2012 election all of it was included in Missouri's 3rd Congressional District, but now about half of it is in the 3rd District, while the northeastern portion is in the 2nd Congressional District and the southern portion is in the 8th Congressional District.

U.S. House of Representatives — District 2 — Jefferson County (2016)
Party	Candidate	Votes	%	±%
Republican	Ann Wagner	11,930	61.04%	−0.87
Democratic	Bill Otto	6,542	33.47%	−0.10
Libertarian	Jim Higgins	783	4.00%	−0.52
Green	David Justus Arnold	291	1.49%	+1.49

U.S. House of Representatives — District 2 — Jefferson County (2014)
Party	Candidate	Votes	%	±%
Republican	Ann Wagner	5,988	61.91%	+6.38
Democratic	Arthur Lieber	3,247	33.57%	−7.41
Libertarian	Bill Slantz	437	4.52%	+1.68

U.S. House of Representatives — District 2 — Jefferson County (2012)
Party	Candidate	Votes	%	±%
Republican	Ann Wagner	9,976	55.53%	
Democratic	Glenn Koenen	7,361	40.98%	
Libertarian	Bill Slantz	511	2.84%	
Constitution	Anatol Zorikova	116	0.65%	

U.S. House of Representatives — District 3 — Jefferson County (2016)
Party	Candidate	Votes	%	±%
Republican	Blaine Luetkemeyer	33,530	61.56%	+1.44
Democratic	Kevin Miller	18,333	33.66%	−1.33
Libertarian	Dan Hogan	2,077	3.81%	−1.07
Constitution	Doanita Simmons	526	0.97%	+0.97

U.S. House of Representatives — District 3 — Jefferson County (2014)
Party	Candidate	Votes	%	±%
Republican	Blaine Luetkemeyer	16,558	60.12%	+7.09
Democratic	Courtney Denton	9,637	34.99%	−7.29
Libertarian	Steven Hedrick	1,345	4.88%	+0.19

U.S. House of Representatives — District 3 — Jefferson County (2012)
Party	Candidate	Votes	%	±%
Republican	Blaine Luetkemeyer	25,898	53.03%	
Democratic	Eric Mayer	20,650	42.28%	
Libertarian	Steven Wilson	2,288	4.69%	

U.S. House of Representatives — District 8 — Jefferson County (2016)
Party	Candidate	Votes	%	±%
Republican	Jason Smith	18,030	63.98%	+11.75
Democratic	Dave Cowell	9,155	32.49%	−5.26
Libertarian	Jonathan Shell	996	3.53%	+0.70

U.S. House of Representatives — District 8 — Jefferson County (2014)
Party	Candidate	Votes	%	±%
Republican	Jason Smith	8,060	52.23%	−5.47
Democratic	Barbara Stocker	5,826	37.75%	−0.80
Libertarian	Rick Vandeven	436	2.83%	+1.22
Constitution	Doug Enyart	544	3.52%	+1.38
Independent	Terry Hampton	567	3.67%	

U.S. House of Representatives — District 8 — Jefferson County (Special Election, June 4, 2013)
Party	Candidate	Votes	%	±%
Republican	Jason Smith	1,862	57.70%	+0.78
Democratic	Steve Hodges	1,244	38.55%	−0.54
Libertarian	Bill Slantz	52	1.61%	−2.38
Constitution	Doug Enyart	69	2.14%	+2.14

U.S. House of Representatives — District 8 — Jefferson County (2012)
Party	Candidate	Votes	%	±%
Republican	Joann Emerson	14,692%	56.92	
Democratic	Jack Rushin	10,090	39.09%	
Libertarian	Rick Vandeven	1,030	3.99%	

==== Political culture ====
United States presidential election results for Jefferson County, Missouri
Year	Republican		Democratic		Third party(ies)	
Year	No.	%	No.	%	No.	%
1888	2,228	47.31%	2,438	51.77%	43	0.91%
1892	2,207	44.70%	2,617	53.01%	113	2.29%
1896	2,876	50.46%	2,785	48.87%	38	0.67%
1900	2,775	49.20%	2,798	49.61%	67	1.19%
1904	2,909	52.09%	2,560	45.84%	116	2.08%
1908	3,050	52.00%	2,698	46.00%	117	1.99%
1912	2,127	40.84%	2,368	45.47%	713	13.69%
1916	3,310	51.01%	3,021	46.56%	158	2.43%
1920	5,730	54.08%	4,684	44.21%	181	1.71%
1924	4,870	48.88%	4,356	43.72%	737	7.40%
1928	6,285	54.47%	5,231	45.34%	22	0.19%
1932	4,559	35.50%	8,130	63.30%	155	1.21%
1936	5,575	37.23%	9,158	61.16%	241	1.61%
1940	7,517	43.92%	9,553	55.82%	45	0.26%
1944	6,758	45.83%	7,953	53.94%	34	0.23%
1948	6,085	37.02%	10,280	62.55%	70	0.43%
1952	9,607	42.82%	12,808	57.08%	22	0.10%
1956	10,712	43.58%	13,868	56.42%	0	0.00%
1960	12,910	43.09%	17,054	56.91%	0	0.00%
1964	7,887	29.43%	18,916	70.57%	0	0.00%
1968	11,708	37.70%	13,230	42.60%	6,115	19.69%
1972	21,947	61.42%	13,787	38.58%	0	0.00%
1976	18,261	41.58%	25,159	57.29%	495	1.13%
1980	28,546	52.01%	24,042	43.81%	2,294	4.18%
1984	34,525	63.29%	20,026	36.71%	0	0.00%
1988	29,279	51.16%	27,738	48.47%	215	0.38%
1992	20,637	28.08%	32,569	44.31%	20,295	27.61%
1996	23,877	36.12%	32,073	48.52%	10,152	15.36%
2000	36,766	47.62%	38,616	50.02%	1,822	2.36%
2004	46,624	49.99%	46,057	49.38%	583	0.63%
2008	50,804	47.91%	53,467	50.42%	1,779	1.68%
2012	53,978	55.07%	41,564	42.40%	2,482	2.53%
2016	69,036	64.52%	31,568	29.50%	6,391	5.97%
2020	77,046	66.03%	37,523	32.16%	2,119	1.82%
2024	80,796	67.72%	36,965	30.98%	1,553	1.30%

A predominantly suburban county, Jefferson County used to be fairly independent-leaning at the federal level with a tendency to tilt Democratic. Presidential elections in Jefferson County were often very close; George W. Bush just narrowly carried the county in 2004 by less than 600 votes and by just over a half of a percentage point. Al Gore and Barack Obama also just narrowly carried the county in 2000 and 2008, respectively. Bill Clinton, however, did manage to carry Jefferson County by double digits both times in 1992 and 1996. However, in 2012 the county, in line with the state as a whole, began to swing hard to the right with Mitt Romney carrying it with 55% of the vote. In 2016 Donald Trump won the county with 65% of the vote, the largest margin of any candidate since Lyndon Johnson in 1964.

Typical of the suburban culture in most counties throughout the country, voters in Jefferson County tend to be rather centrist on social issues but more liberal on economic issues. In 2004, Missourians voted on a constitutional amendment to define marriage as the union between a man and a woman—it overwhelmingly passed Jefferson County with 72.56 percent of the vote. The initiative passed the state with 71 percent of support from voters as Missouri became the first state to ban same-sex marriage. In 2006, Missourians voted on a constitutional amendment to fund and legalize embryonic stem cell research in the state—it narrowly passed Jefferson County with 51.85 percent voting for the measure. The initiative narrowly passed the state with 51 percent of support from voters as Missouri became one of the first states in the nation to approve embryonic stem cell research. In 2006, Missourians voted on a proposition (Proposition B) to increase the minimum wage in the state to $6.50 an hour—it passed Jefferson County with 79.90 percent of the vote. The proposition strongly passed every single county in Missouri with 78.99 percent voting in favor as the minimum wage was increased to $6.50 an hour in the state. During the same election, voters in five other states also strongly approved increases in the minimum wage.

==== 2008 Missouri presidential primary ====
Republican

U.S. Senator John McCain (R-Arizona) won Jefferson County with 33.54% of the vote. Former Governor Mitt Romney (R-Massachusetts) finished in second with 30.45% of the vote, while former Governor Mike Huckabee (R-Arkansas) came in third with 30.19% in Jefferson County. Libertarian-leaning U.S. Representative Ron Paul (R-Texas) finished a distant fourth place with 3.94% of the vote in Jefferson County. McCain received all of Missouri's 58 delegates as the Republican Party utilizes the winner-takes-all system.

Democratic

U.S. Senator Hillary Clinton (D-New York) won Jefferson County over Senator Barack Obama (D-Illinois) with 61.32% of the vote, while Obama received 35.02% of the vote. Although he withdrew from the race, former U.S. Senator John Edwards (D-North Carolina) still received 2.74% of the vote in Jefferson County. Jefferson County gave Clinton one of her strongest showings in a predominantly suburban county in the entire country.

Clinton had a large initial lead in Missouri at the beginning of the evening as the rural precincts began to report, leading several news organizations to call the state for her; however, Obama rallied from behind as the heavily African American precincts from St. Louis began to report and eventually put him over the top. In the end, Obama received 49.32 percent of the vote to Clinton's 47.90% — a 1.42% difference. Both candidates split Missouri's 72 delegates, as the Democratic Party utilizes proportional representation.

Hillary Rodham Clinton received more votes, a total of 19,075, than any candidate from either party in Jefferson County during the 2008 Missouri Presidential Primaries. She also received more votes than the total number of votes cast in the entire Republican Primary in Jefferson County.

== Health ==
According to a 2012 census study by the University of Wisconsin Population Health Institute and the Robert Wood Johnson Foundation, Jefferson County led the Saint Louis metropolitan area in the number of adults who smoke, roughly 30% of all adult residents of Jefferson County smoked or used tobacco in some form, compared to the 19% national average and the 24% Missouri state average.

Jefferson County and the state of Missouri led the nation in methamphetamine production, peaking in the mid-2000s.

== Jefferson County Parks and Recreation ==
- Big River Saddle Club
- Brown's Ford
- Cedar Hill
- Fletcher House
- High Ridge Civic Center
- Rockford Park
- Jefferson Winter Park
- Morse Mill
- Pleasant Valley
- Sunridge
- NW Jefferson County Sports Complex

== Communities ==
=== Cities ===
- Arnold
- Byrnes Mill
- Crystal City
- De Soto
- Eureka (Mostly in St.Louis County)
- Festus
- Herculaneum
- Hillsboro (county seat)
- Kimmswick
- Olympian Village
- Pevely

=== Villages ===
- Cedar Hill Lakes
- Lake Tekakwitha
- Parkdale
- Peaceful Village
- Scotsdale

=== Townships ===
- Big River
- Central
- High Ridge
- Joachim
- Meramec
- Plattin
- Rock
- Valle

=== Census-designated places ===
- Barnhart
- Briarwood Estates
- Cedar Hill
- High Ridge
- Horine
- Imperial
- LaBarque Creek
- Murphy
- Raintree Plantation
- Summer Set

=== Other unincorporated communities ===
- Antonia
- Bailey
- Belews Creek
- Bushburg
- Byrnesville
- Danby
- Dittmer
- Donnell
- Fletcher
- Flucom
- Frumet
- Goldman
- Grubville
- Hematite
- House Springs
- Jarvis
- Knorpp
- Liguori
- Local
- Ludwig
- Mapaville
- Melzo
- Meramec Heights
- Morse Mill
- Munsons
- Oermann
- Old Mines
- Papin
- Plattin
- Regina
- Riverside
- Rush Tower
- Seckman
- Selma
- Sulphur Springs
- Valles Mines
- Victoria
- Vineland
- Ware

== See also ==
- List of counties in Missouri
- National Register of Historic Places listings in Jefferson County, Missouri
- Matthew "Mack" Harrison Marsden
