= Northwest High School (Missouri) =

American high school in Missouri

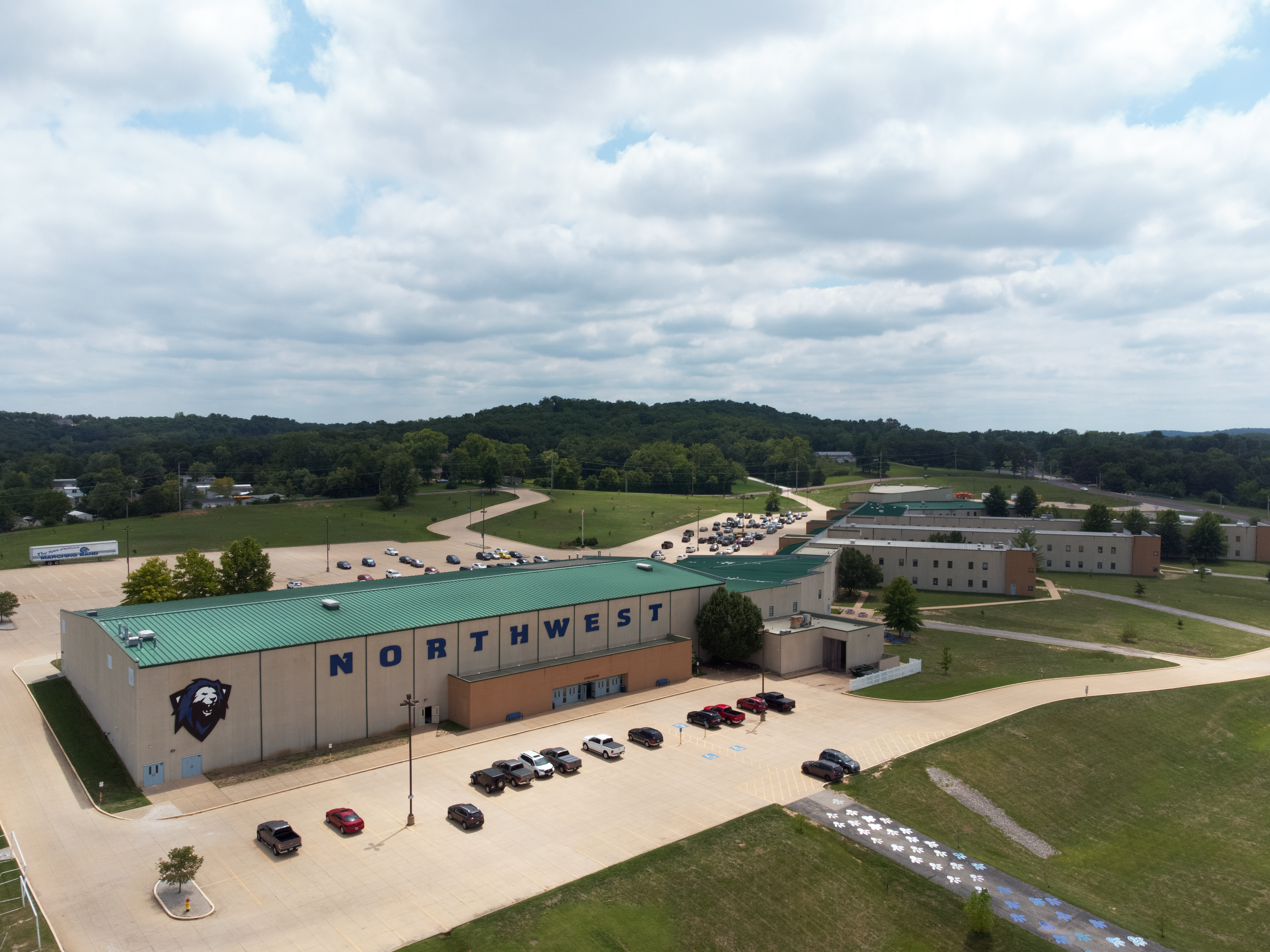
- Northwest High School in 2022

Location
- 6005 Cedar Hill Road; Cedar Hill, Missouri; 38°22′16″N 90°37′41″W

Information
- Type: Public co-ed secondary
- Established: 1955; 71 years ago
- School district: Northwest R-I School District
- Superintendent: Jennifer Hecktor
- Principal: Stella Viehland
- Teaching staff: 110.88 (on an FTE basis)
- Grades: 9–12
- Enrollment: 1,851 (2023–24)
- Student to teacher ratio: 16.69
- Colors: Blue and white
- Athletics conference: Suburban Conference
- Nickname: Lions
- Newspaper: The DeTail
- Yearbook: Lion Trac
- Website: northwestschools.net

Northwest High School is a public high school located in Cedar Hill, Missouri that is part of the Northwest R-1 School District.

== Athletics ==
For the 2011–12 school year, the school offered 20 activities approved by the Missouri State High School Activities Association (MSHSAA): baseball, boys and girls basketball, sideline cheerleading, boys and girls cross country, dance team, 11-man football, boys and girls golf, music activities, boys and girls soccer, softball, boys and girls track and field, boys and girls volleyball, winter guard, and wrestling. In addition to its current activities, Northwest students have won two state championships, including:

- Softball: 1986
- Wrestling: 1984

Northwest also has two individual boys cross country champions and four individual wrestling champions.

== Notable alumni ==
- Brian Boehringer: Major League Baseball player
- David Frisch: National Football League player
- Michael Chandler: professional mixed martial artist fighter, former Lightweight Champion of Bellator MMA
- Audrey Lipsmire: television writer, The Lincoln Lawyer on Netflix
