= Crystal City, Missouri =

- City
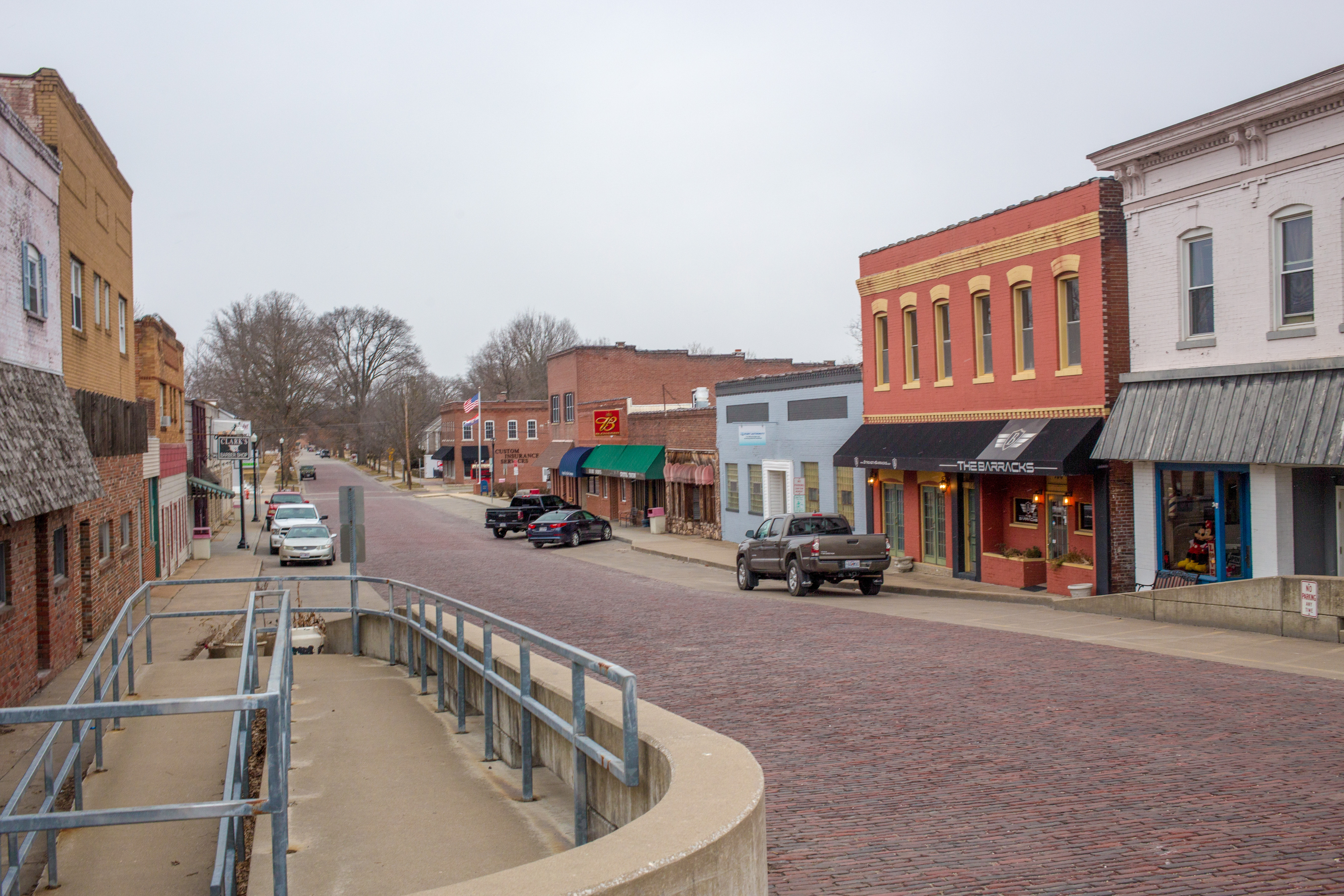
- Nickname: Crystal Clear town
- Location of Crystal City, Missouri
- Coordinates: 38°13′22″N 90°22′53″W
- Country: United States
- State: Missouri
- County: Jefferson
- Incorporated: 1911

Government
  - Mayor: Mike Osher

Area
  - Total: 4.52 sq mi (11.71 km^{2})
  - Land: 4.51 sq mi (11.69 km^{2})
  - Water: 0.0077 sq mi (0.02 km^{2})
- Elevation: 440 ft (130 m)

Population (2020)
  - Total: 4,740
  - Density: 1,049.7/sq mi (405.31/km^{2})
- Time zone: UTC-6 (Central (CST))
  - Summer (DST): UTC-5 (CDT)
- ZIP code: 63019
- Area code: 636
- FIPS code: 29-17632
- GNIS feature ID: 2393684
- Website: crystalcitymo.gov

Crystal City is a city in eastern Jefferson County, Missouri, United States and is a suburb of St. Louis. The population was 4,855 at the 2010 census. It was 4,740 at the 2020 census.

Crystal City and its neighbor Festus are often collectively known as the "Twin Cities".

== History ==
Crystal City was originally called New Detroit. The post office called Crystal City has been in operation since 1872. In the 1880s, Pittsburgh Plate Glass Company opened a glass manufacturing plant, which is the origin of the city's name. By 2008, the PPG plant property was empty and undeveloped. It was purchased by Wings Enterprises in the mid-2000s with the intent to construct an iron ore smelter. In the early 2000s, the state of Missouri forced Doe Run Company to purchase 160 homes in Herculaneum after it was found over 56% of children within a quarter-mile (0.4 km) of the plant had high levels of lead in their blood. This prompted greater concern when Crystal City engaged in discussions over building a $1 billion dollar iron-ore smelter on the land of the abandoned factory.

== Geography ==
Crystal City is located adjacent to the Mississippi River floodplain to the east and the city of Festus to the west.

According to the United States Census Bureau, the city has a total area of 4.57 square miles (11.84 km^{2}), of which 4.56 square miles (11.81 km^{2}) is land and 0.01 square miles (0.03 km^{2}) is water.

== Demographics ==
Historical population
Census	Pop.	Note	%±
1880	460		—
1890	1,104		140.0%
1920	2,243		—
1930	3,057		36.3%
1940	3,417		11.8%
1950	3,499		2.4%
1960	3,678		5.1%
1970	3,898		6.0%
1980	3,618		−7.2%
1990	4,088		13.0%
2000	4,247		3.9%
2010	4,855		14.3%
2020	4,740		−2.4%
U.S. Decennial Census

=== 2020 census ===
As of the 2020 census, Crystal City had a population of 4,740. The median age was 38.9 years. 22.4% of residents were under the age of 18 and 19.6% of residents were 65 years of age or older. For every 100 females there were 89.8 males, and for every 100 females age 18 and over there were 85.7 males age 18 and over.

99.4% of residents lived in urban areas, while 0.6% lived in rural areas.

There were 1,838 households in Crystal City, of which 31.7% had children under the age of 18 living in them. Of all households, 43.3% were married-couple households, 17.4% were households with a male householder and no spouse or partner present, and 29.7% were households with a female householder and no spouse or partner present. About 28.2% of all households were made up of individuals and 11.7% had someone living alone who was 65 years of age or older.

There were 1,951 housing units, of which 5.8% were vacant. The homeowner vacancy rate was 1.0% and the rental vacancy rate was 4.8%.

Racial composition as of the 2020 census
Race	Number	Percent
White	4,215	88.9%
Black or African American	161	3.4%
American Indian and Alaska Native	16	0.3%
Asian	34	0.7%
Native Hawaiian and Other Pacific Islander	3	0.1%
Some other race	18	0.4%
Two or more races	293	6.2%
Hispanic or Latino (of any race)	52	1.1%

=== 2010 census ===
As of the census of 2010, there were 4,855 people, 1,894 households, and 1,228 families living in the city. The population density was 1,064.7 inhabitants per square mile (411.1/km^{2}). There were 2,078 housing units at an average density of 455.7 per square mile (175.9/km^{2}). The racial makeup of the city was 93.2% White, 3.7% African American, 0.4% Native American, 0.6% Asian, 0.3% from other races, and 1.9% from two or more races. Hispanic or Latino of any race were 1.0% of the population.

There were 1,894 households, of which 36.0% had children under the age of 18 living with them, 45.9% were married couples living together, 13.7% had a female householder with no husband present, 5.2% had a male householder with no wife present, and 35.2% were non-families. 29.4% of all households were made up of individuals, and 12.3% had someone living alone who was 65 years of age or older. The average household size was 2.47 and the average family size was 3.06.

The median age in the city was 37.1 years. 25.7% of residents were under the age of 18; 7.8% were between the ages of 18 and 24; 25.9% were from 25 to 44; 24.2% were from 45 to 64; and 16.5% were 65 years of age or older. The gender makeup of the city was 47.6% male and 52.4% female.

=== 2000 census ===
As of the census of 2000, there were 4,247 people, 1,622 households, and 1,111 families living in the city. The population density was 1,136.7 inhabitants per square mile (438.9/km^{2}). There were 1,769 housing units at an average density of 473.5 per square mile (182.8/km^{2}). The racial makeup of the city was 92.11% White, 5.34% African American, 0.26% Native American, 0.52% Asian, 0.07% from other races, and 1.70% from two or more races. Hispanic or Latino of any race were 0.49% of the population.

There were 1,622 households, out of which 32.2% had children under the age of 18 living with them, 51.2% were married couples living together, 13.8% had a female householder with no husband present, and 31.5% were non-families. 28.2% of all households were made up of individuals, and 13.6% had someone living alone who was 65 years of age or older. The average household size was 2.44 and the average family size was 2.97.

In the city, the population was spread out, with 24.0% under the age of 18, 8.5% from 18 to 24, 25.7% from 25 to 44, 21.5% from 45 to 64, and 20.3% who were 65 years of age or older. The median age was 40 years. For every 100 females, there were 87.6 males. For every 100 females age 18 and over, there were 81.1 males.

The median income for a household in the city was $36,117, and the median income for a family was $45,288. Males had a median income of $41,111 versus $23,750 for females. The per capita income for the city was $17,816. About 12.6% of families and 15.2% of the population were below the poverty line, including 21.6% of those under age 18 and 6.3% of those age 65 or over.

== Education ==
Crystal City 47 Public Schools operates one elementary school and Crystal City High School.

St. Pius X High School is a private Catholic high school in Crystal City.

The town has a lending library, the Crystal City Public Library.

== Notable people ==
- Bill Bradley, former NBA player and United States senator
- Margaret B. Kelly, former Missouri State Auditor
- Danny Kladis, auto racer
- Dan LaRose, football player
- Tom Santschi (Paul William Santschi), silent film actor
