= De Soto, Missouri =

City in Missouri, Jefferson County, United States

- City
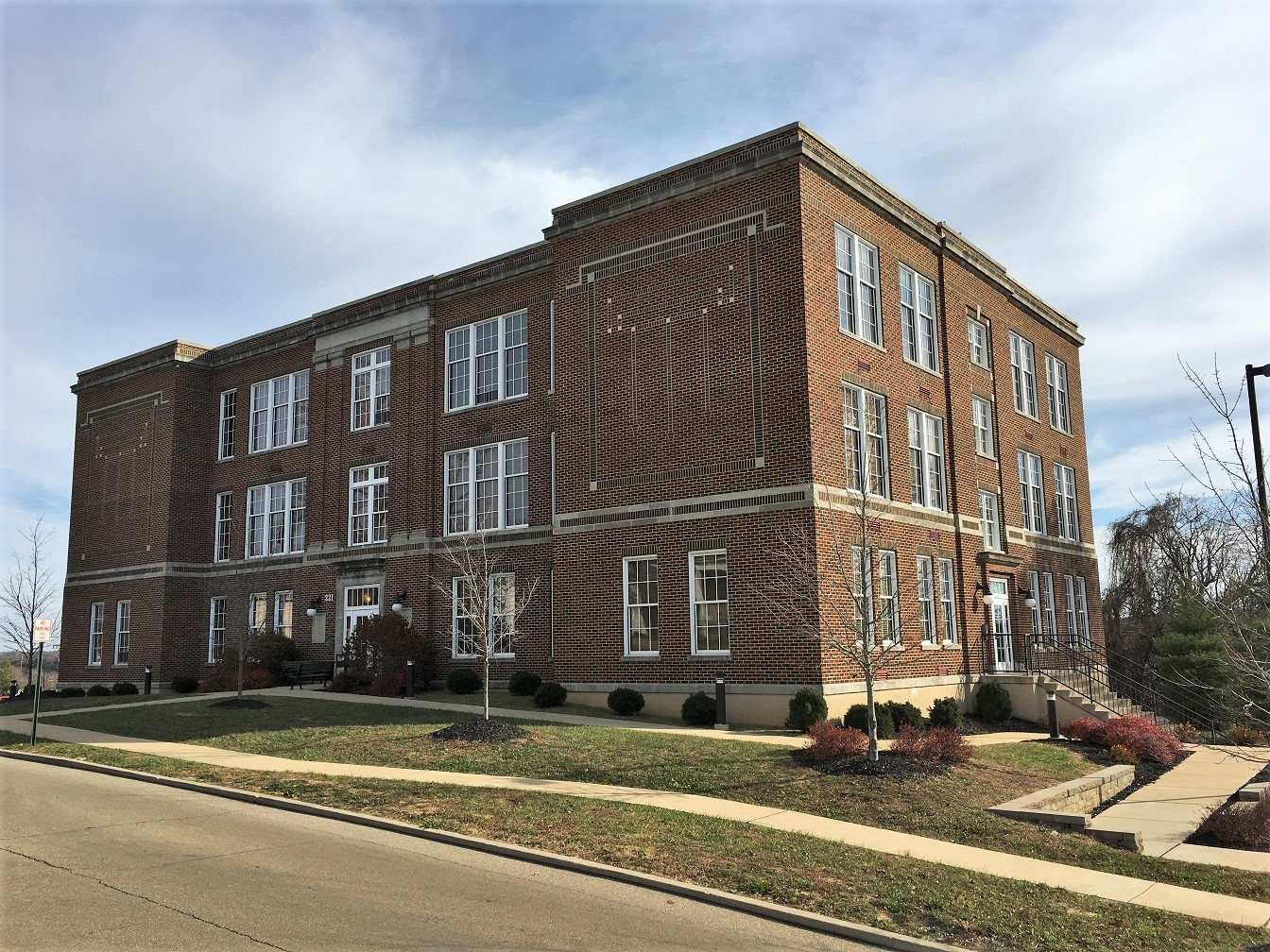
- Main Street Melba Theater Central School Campus St. Rose of Lima Catholic Church Arlington Event Center City Hall

- Location of De Soto, Missouri
- Coordinates: 38°08′28″N 90°33′39″W
- Country: United States
- State: Missouri
- County: Jefferson
- Incorporated: 1869

Area
  - Total: 4.38 sq mi (11.35 km^{2})
  - Land: 4.38 sq mi (11.35 km^{2})
  - Water: 0 sq mi (0.00 km^{2})
- Elevation: 545 ft (166 m)

Population (2020)
  - Total: 6,449
  - Density: 1,471/sq mi (568.1/km^{2})
- Time zone: UTC-6 (Central (CST))
  - Summer (DST): UTC-5 (CDT)
- ZIP code: 63020
- Area code: 636
- FIPS code: 29-19252
- GNIS feature ID: 2394475
- Website: desotomo.com

De Soto is a city in Jefferson County, Missouri, United States. The population was 6,449 at the 2020 census and the city is part of the St. Louis metropolitan area. Isaac Van Metre was first to settle in De Soto in the year of 1803. The town was organized in 1857 and is named for the explorer Hernando De Soto, who claimed the Louisiana Territory for Spain. De Soto was the city closest to the mean center of U.S. population in 1980. The city celebrated its Bicentennial in 2003. The city made national news on and after May 6, 2003, when straight-line winds and a tornado struck the junior high gymnasium.

== History ==
De Soto was platted in 1857 and named after Hernando de Soto (c. 1496/1497–1542), Spanish conquistador. A post office has been in operation at De Soto since 1858.

The city is known as "Fountain City" because of its numerous artesian wells. Water from these wells and springs were bottled and shipped by tank car to the 1904 World Fair in St. Louis.

The Central School Campus and Louis J. and Harriet Rozier House are listed on the National Register of Historic Places.

In 1953 and 1959 De Soto was voted an All-America City by the National Civic League.

== Geography ==
The community is located along Joachim Creek in southwest Jefferson County. Missouri Route 21 passes just west to the west and Missouri Route 110 connects to US Route 67 approximately three miles east of the town.

According to the United States Census Bureau, the city has a total area of 4.30 square miles (11.14 km^{2}), all land.

== Demographics ==
Historical population
Census	Pop.	Note	%±
1880	1,989		—
1890	3,960		99.1%
1900	5,611		41.7%
1910	4,721		−15.9%
1920	5,003		6.0%
1930	5,069		1.3%
1940	5,121		1.0%
1950	5,357		4.6%
1960	5,804		8.3%
1970	5,984		3.1%
1980	5,993		0.2%
1990	5,993		0.0%
2000	6,375		6.4%
2010	6,400		0.4%
2020	6,449		0.8%
U.S. Decennial Census

=== 2020 census ===
As of the 2020 census, De Soto had a population of 6,449. The median age was 38.9 years. 22.6% of residents were under the age of 18 and 18.7% of residents were 65 years of age or older. For every 100 females there were 92.3 males, and for every 100 females age 18 and over there were 87.3 males age 18 and over.

97.3% of residents lived in urban areas, while 2.7% lived in rural areas.

There were 2,624 households in De Soto, of which 30.6% had children under the age of 18 living in them. Of all households, 37.8% were married-couple households, 20.1% were households with a male householder and no spouse or partner present, and 33.2% were households with a female householder and no spouse or partner present. About 35.1% of all households were made up of individuals and 15.1% had someone living alone who was 65 years of age or older.

There were 2,995 housing units, of which 12.4% were vacant. The homeowner vacancy rate was 2.8% and the rental vacancy rate was 11.0%.

Racial composition as of the 2020 census
Race	Number	Percent
White	5,859	90.9%
Black or African American	76	1.2%
American Indian and Alaska Native	20	0.3%
Asian	12	0.2%
Native Hawaiian and Other Pacific Islander	0	0.0%
Some other race	49	0.8%
Two or more races	433	6.7%
Hispanic or Latino (of any race)	87	1.3%

=== 2010 census ===
As of the census of 2010, there were 6,400 people, 2,629 households, and 1,633 families residing in the city. The population density was 1,488.4 inhabitants per square mile (574.7/km^{2}). There were 2,927 housing units at an average density of 680.7 units per square mile (262.8 units/km^{2}). The racial makeup of the city was 95.8% White, 1.6% African American, 0.4% Native American, 0.4% Asian, 0.3% from other races, and 1.4% from two or more races. Hispanic or Latino of any race were 0.8% of the population.

There were 2,629 households, of which 33.5% had children under the age of 18 living with them, 41.0% were married couples living together, 14.6% had a female householder with no husband present, 6.5% had a male householder with no wife present, and 37.9% were non-families. 31.6% of all households were made up of individuals, and 13.5% had someone living alone who was 65 years of age or older. The average household size was 2.38 and the average family size was 2.97.

The median age in the city was 36.8 years. 24.8% of residents were under the age of 18; 8.9% were between the ages of 18 and 24; 26% were from 25 to 44; 24.2% were from 45 to 64; 16.1% were 65 years of age or older. The gender makeup of the city was 47.2% male and 52.8% female.

=== 2000 census ===
As of the census of 2000, there were 6,375 people, 2,544 households, and 1,656 families residing in the city. The population density was 1,673.6 inhabitants per square mile (646.2/km^{2}). There were 2,741 housing units at an average density of 719.6 units per square mile (277.8 units/km^{2}). The racial makeup of the city was 96.71% White, 1.71% African American, 0.31% Native American, 0.19% Asian, 0.02% Pacific Islander, 0.27% from other races, and 0.80% from two or more races. Hispanic or Latino of any race were 1.02% of the population.

There were 2,544 households, out of which 31.7% had children under the age of 18 living with them, 48.3% were married couples living together, 12.9% had a female householder with no husband present, and 34.9% were non-families. 29.8% of all households were made up of individuals, and 15.0% had someone living alone who was 65 years of age or older. The average household size was 2.42 and the average family size was 2.99.

In the city, the population was spread out, with 25.3% under the age of 18, 8.8% from 18 to 24, 27.1% from 25 to 44, 20.2% from 45 to 64, and 18.6% who were 65 years of age or older. The median age was 37 years. For every 100 females, there were 87.3 males. For every 100 females age 18 and over, there were 82.0 males.

The median income for a household in the city was $30,725, and the median income for a family was $37,486. Males had a median income of $33,163 versus $20,039 for females. The per capita income for the city was $14,971. About 11.4% of families and 14.7% of the population were below the poverty line, including 19.1% of those under age 18 and 12.1% of those age 65 or over.

== Economy ==
The local economy is fueled by Union Pacific Railroad which operates a car repair shop on the east side of Main Street. Wal-Mart and De Soto School District #73 are the largest employers.

== Transportation ==
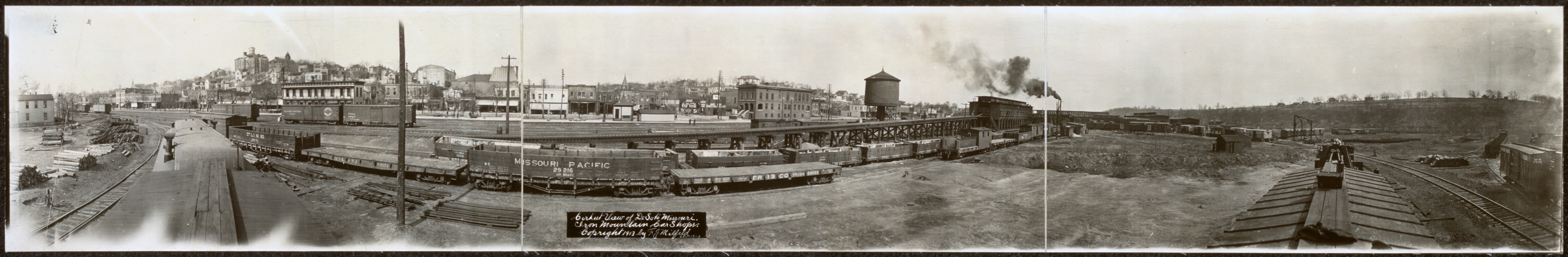
Looking at the train tracks, Main Street in background.

De Soto's main train station on the Missouri Pacific Railroad was constructed in 1919 and demolished in 1982. It had passenger service until April 30, 1971; for several decades afterward, Amtrak's Texas Eagle passed through De Soto without stopping. Amtrak announced in 2023 that it would add a De Soto stop to the Texas Eagle, pending agreements with Union Pacific and construction of a platform, after the city government had campaigned for its inclusion.

== Education ==
The Public schools in De Soto are run by the De Soto Public School District #73:

- De Soto Senior High School
- De Soto Middle School/Junior High School
- Vineland Elementary School
- Athena Elementary School

The De Soto Public School District #73 has about 2,500 students.

St. Rose of Lima School is the only private school in town run by St. Rose of Lima Catholic Church.

The closest institution of higher education is in Hillsboro, Missouri at Jefferson College.

The town has a lending library, the De Soto Public Library.

== Tornado activity ==
On December 21, 1967, an F4 tornado 16.8 miles away from the city center killed three people, injured 52 people, and caused between $500,000 and $5,000,000 in damages.

On June 22, 1969, an F4 (max. wind speeds 207-260 mph) tornado 13.5 miles away from the De Soto city center killed two people and injured 22 people and caused between $500,000 and $5,000,000 in damages.

On April 22, 1981, a tornado destroyed the Joachim Savings & Loan, the offices of the Republic and Press newspaper, and a tire store. One person was killed in the Savings & Loan.

On May 6, 2003, at approximately 3:45 pm, a tornado outbreak began in Kansas, Missouri, and Tennessee. At 5:14pm, a tornado touched down two miles northwest of De Soto. Fourteen minutes later, the tornado sirens went off in Jefferson County. The tornado hit De Soto at F3 intensity, causing $12,800,000 in damage. The tornado destroyed the junior high gymnasium, caused significant damage to the high school and Vineland Elementary, destroyed 58 houses and a local grocery store. It injured 23 and killed nine inside De Soto.

== Local attractions ==
- Melba Theater
- De Soto Public Library
- Spross Park
- Walther's Park
- Richter Park
- Knights Of Columbus

== Notable people ==
- Mel Bay, musician, music teacher, and publisher of sheet music
- Thomas Clement Fletcher, Governor of Missouri
- Whitey Ford, comedian known as "The Duke of Paducah"
- Michael H. Hall, Wisconsin State Assemblyman
- Juanita Hamel, newspaper illustrator and writer
- Burdette Johnson, numismatist
- William E. Lewis, Missouri state representative
- Jay Nixon, 55th Governor of Missouri and former state Attorney General
- Frank Wilcox, actor

== See also ==
- List of cities in Missouri
