= Cedar Hill, Missouri =

- Census-designated place
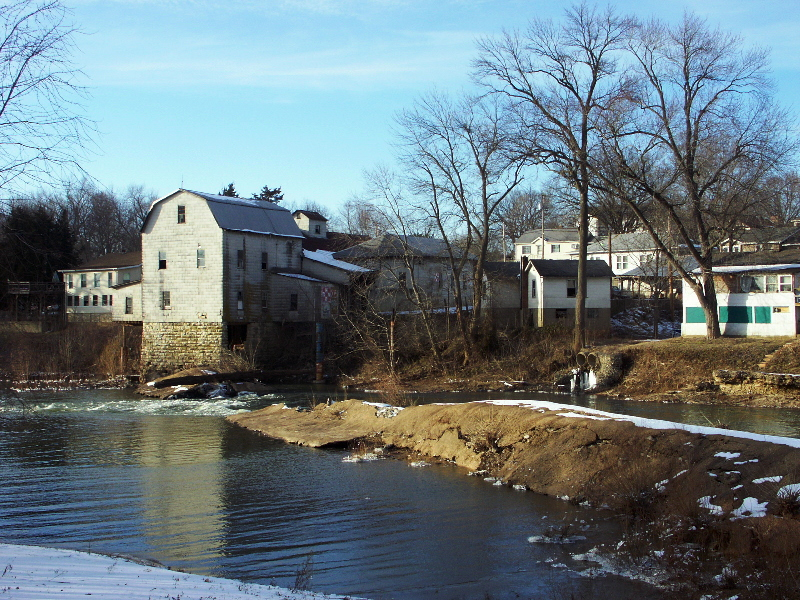
- Dam on the Big River at Cedar Hill

- Location of Cedar Hill, Missouri
- Coordinates: 38°21′24″N 90°37′20″W
- Country: United States
- State: Missouri
- County: Jefferson

Area
  - Total: 2.29 sq mi (5.94 km^{2})
  - Land: 2.29 sq mi (5.94 km^{2})
  - Water: 0 sq mi (0.00 km^{2})
- Elevation: 538 ft (164 m)

Population (2020)
  - Total: 1,875
  - Density: 816.9/sq mi (315.42/km^{2})
- Time zone: UTC-6 (Central (CST))
  - Summer (DST): UTC-5 (CDT)
- ZIP code: 63016
- Area code: 636
- FIPS code: 29-12358
- GNIS feature ID: 2393369

Cedar Hill is an unincorporated community and census-designated place (CDP) in northwest Jefferson County, Missouri, United States. The population was 1,721 at the 2010 census.

== History ==
A post office called Cedar Hill has been in operation since 1868. The community was named for cedar trees near the elevated town site.

== Geography ==
Cedar Hill is located 32 miles (51 km) southwest of downtown St. Louis. Missouri Route 30, a four-lane highway, runs through the western side of the CDP, leading northeast into St. Louis and west 22 miles (35 km) to St. Clair.

According to the United States Census Bureau, the CDP has a total area of 2.3 square miles (5.9 km^{2}), all land. The Big River, a northward-flowing tributary of the Meramec River, forms the southern and western limits of the CDP, and the community is the site of an old mill and dam.

== Demographics ==
Historical population
Census	Pop.	Note	%±
2000	1,703		—
2010	1,721		1.1%
2020	1,875		8.9%
U.S. Decennial Census

=== 2020 census ===
As of the 2020 census, Cedar Hill had a population of 1,875. The median age was 39.3 years. 25.0% of residents were under the age of 18 and 14.5% of residents were 65 years of age or older. For every 100 females there were 107.9 males, and for every 100 females age 18 and over there were 103.0 males age 18 and over.

0.0% of residents lived in urban areas, while 100.0% lived in rural areas.

There were 713 households in Cedar Hill, of which 31.1% had children under the age of 18 living in them. Of all households, 51.2% were married-couple households, 19.2% were households with a male householder and no spouse or partner present, and 22.9% were households with a female householder and no spouse or partner present. About 24.0% of all households were made up of individuals and 6.5% had someone living alone who was 65 years of age or older.

There were 763 housing units, of which 6.6% were vacant. The homeowner vacancy rate was 1.5% and the rental vacancy rate was 0.0%.

Racial composition as of the 2020 census
Race	Number	Percent
White	1,712	91.3%
Black or African American	2	0.1%
American Indian and Alaska Native	20	1.1%
Asian	9	0.5%
Native Hawaiian and Other Pacific Islander	0	0.0%
Some other race	9	0.5%
Two or more races	123	6.6%
Hispanic or Latino (of any race)	37	2.0%

=== 2000 census ===
As of the census of 2000, there were 1,703 people, 627 households, and 465 families residing in the CDP. The population density was 741.6 inhabitants per square mile (286.3/km^{2}). There were 657 housing units at an average density of 286.1 per square mile (110.5/km^{2}). The racial makeup of the CDP was 97.89% White, 0.06% African American, 0.82% Native American, 0.18% Asian, 0.35% from other races, and 0.70% from two or more races. Hispanic or Latino of any race were 0.82% of the population.

There were 627 households, out of which 38.8% had children under the age of 18 living with them, 56.5% were married couples living together, 11.5% had a female householder with no husband present, and 25.7% were non-families. 19.6% of all households were made up of individuals, and 7.0% had someone living alone who was 65 years of age or older. The average household size was 2.72 and the average family size was 3.11.

In the CDP, the population was spread out, with 27.2% under the age of 18, 9.9% from 18 to 24, 30.0% from 25 to 44, 24.7% from 45 to 64, and 8.2% who were 65 years of age or older. The median age was 35 years. For every 100 females, there were 97.1 males. For every 100 females age 18 and over, there were 95.1 males.

The median income for a household in the CDP was $35,481, and the median income for a family was $43,214. Males had a median income of $40,160 versus $21,074 for females. The per capita income for the CDP was $15,599. About 5.7% of families and 12.9% of the population were below the poverty line, including 6.1% of those under age 18 and 8.8% of those age 65 or over.
