= 2018 Jefferson County, Missouri Executive election =

- November 6, 2018

Nominee	Dennis Gannon	Jeff Roorda
Party	Republican	Democratic
Popular vote	50,713	36,220
Percentage	58.34%	41.66%
County Executive before election
Ken Waller
Republican
Elected County Executive
Dennis Gannon
Republican

The 2018 Jefferson County, Missouri Executive election took place on November 6, 2018. Incumbent County Executive Ken Waller declined to run for re-election to a third term, instead opting to run for County Clerk. Businessman Dennis Gannon, the former President of the County Port Authority, won the Republican primary over sheriff's deputy Gary Stout, and faced former State Representative Jeff Roorda, the Democratic nominee, in the general election. Gannon defeated Roorda by a wide margin, winning 58 percent of the vote.

== Democratic primary ==
=== Candidates ===
- Jeff Roorda, former State Representative

=== Results ===
Democratic primary results
Party	Candidate	Votes	%
Democratic	Jeff Roorda	19,572	100.00%
Total votes		19,572	100.00%

== Republican primary ==
=== Candidates ===
- Dennis Gannon, businessman, former President of the Jefferson County Port Authority
- Gary Stout, county sheriff's deputy, businessman, 2014 Democratic candidate for County Executive

=== Results ===
Republican primary results
Party	Candidate	Votes	%
Republican	Dennis Gannon	16,940	65.61%
Republican	Gary Stout	8,879	34.39%
Total votes		25,819	100.00%

== General election ==
=== Polling ===
Poll source	Date(s) administered	Sample size (Note: Key: A – all adults RV – registered voters LV – likely voters V – unclear)	Margin of error	Dennis Gannon (R)	Jeff Roorda (D)	Undecided
Voice Broadcast Corp (Note: Poll sponsored by Roorda's campaign)	October 2–4, 2018	581 (LV)	± 3.1%	35%	40%	25%

=== Results ===
2018 Jefferson County Executive election
Party	Candidate	Votes	%
Republican	Dennis Gannon	50,713	58.34%
Democratic	Jeff Roorda	36,220	41.66%
Total votes		86,933	100.00%
Republican hold			

== Notes ==
Partisan clients
