= 2014 Jefferson County, Missouri Executive election =

- November 4, 2014

Nominee	Ken Waller	Sam Rauls
Party	Republican	Democratic
Popular vote	30,271	20,236
Percentage	57.06%	38.14%
County Executive before election
Ken Waller
Republican
Elected County Executive
Ken Waller
Republican

The 2014 Jefferson County, Missouri Executive election took place on November 4, 2014. Incumbent County Executive Ken Waller ran for re-election to a second term. He won a contested Republican primary and faced former County Commissioner Sam Rauls, the Democratic nominee, in the general election. Though Waller only narrowly won his first term in 2010, he won re-election by a wide margin, receiving 57 percent of the vote to Rauls's 38 percent.

== Democratic primary ==
=== Candidates ===
- Sam Rauls, former County Commissioner
- Gary Stout, county sheriff's deputy
- Bob Schott

=== Results ===
Democratic primary results
Party	Candidate	Votes	%
Democratic	Sam Rauls	7,870	60.28%
Democratic	Gary Stout	2,756	21.11%
Democratic	Bob Schott	2,429	18.61%
Total votes		13,055	100.00%

== Republican primary ==
=== Candidates ===
- Ken Waller, incumbent County Executive
- Mark Paul, businessman, Republican committeeman
- Chris "Borgy" Borgerson, businessman

=== Results ===
Republican primary results
Party	Candidate	Votes	%
Republican	Ken Waller (inc.)	8,252	57.97%
Republican	Mark Paul	4,714	33.12%
Republican	Chris "Borgy" Borgerson	1,268	8.91%
Total votes		14,234	100.00%

== Constitution primary ==
=== Candidates ===
- J. Bennett

=== Results ===
Constitution primary results
Party	Candidate	Votes	%
Constitution	J. Bennett	150	100.00%
Total votes		150	100.00%

== General election ==
=== Results ===
2014 Jefferson County Executive election
Party	Candidate	Votes	%
Republican	Ken Waller (inc.)	30,271	57.06%
Democratic	Sam Rauls	20,236	38.14%
Constitution	J. Bennett	2,545	4.80%
Total votes		53,052	100.00%
Republican hold			
