= Jeff Roorda =

American politician

Member of the Missouri House of Representatives from the 113th district
- In office 2013–2015
- Succeeded by: Dan Shaul

Member of the Missouri House of Representatives from the 102nd district
- In office 2005–2011
- Preceded by: Ryan McKenna
- Succeeded by: Paul Wieland

Personal details
- Born: March 30, 1965 (age 61) St. Louis, Missouri, U.S.
- Party: Republican (2021-present)
- Other political affiliations: Democratic (until 2021)
- Education: Missouri Baptist University; University of Missouri-St. Louis

Jeffrey Roorda is an American politician. He was a Democratic member of the Missouri House of Representatives, serving from 2005 to 2010 and again from 2013 to 2015. A former police officer, he served as the executive director and business manager of the St. Louis Police Officers Association (SLPOA) from 2011-2022. SLPOA is Lodge #68 of the Fraternal Order of Police, covering the St. Louis Metropolitan Police Department (SLMPD).

== Early life and education ==
Jeff Roorda was born in St. Louis, Missouri on March 30, 1965, the oldest of two sons. He lived in St. Louis with his parents and younger brother until he was twelve years old when Roorda's family moved to Arnold, a St. Louis suburb in Jefferson County, Missouri. Roorda graduated from Windsor High School in Jefferson County. Roorda received an associate degree in Criminal Justice from Jefferson College in Hillsboro, Missouri and later went on to earn his bachelor's degree from Missouri Baptist University and his Masters in Public Policy Administration from University of Missouri--St. Louis. Roorda married his wife Nancy in 1994. They have three daughters.

== Career ==
Roorda worked in law enforcement for seventeen years. He was a police officer in Arnold, Missouri until 2001, when he was fired for making allegedly false statements and filing false reports. Later, he became chief of police in Kimmswick, another city in Jefferson County. He was the executive director and a business manager of the St. Louis Police Officers Association.

=== Politics ===
Roorda was elected to the Missouri House of Representatives in 2004 as a Democrat in district 102, representing the Imperial, Missouri area. He won a three-way primary by 83 votes and then defeated Republican Marvin Lutes with 50.86% of the vote in the general election. In 2006, Roorda won a rematch with Lutes, garnering 60% of the vote. He won a third term unopposed in 2008. In 2010, Roorda was defeated by Republican Paul Wieland, who won 50.3% of the vote in a three-way race.

After Missouri redistricted its legislature following the 2010 Census, Roorda ran for the state House of Representatives again, this time in district 113. He was unopposed in the Democratic primary, then defeated Dan Smith, Republican, in the general election with 54% of the vote.

Roorda faced off again with Wieland in 2014 in a race for the open 22nd district state Senate seat, representing most of Jefferson County, that was vacated by Democrat Ryan McKenna. Wieland again defeated Roorda, this time by a 54%-46% margin.

In 2016, Roorda entered the race for Jefferson County Council district 4, representing the Barnhart area. Incumbent councilman George Engelbach was defeated in the Republican primary by Charles Groeteke, who then defeated Roorda in the general election with 56% of the vote.

Roorda announced on October 1, 2017 that he would run as a Democrat for Jefferson County Executive in 2018. He was defeated in November by Republican Dennis Gannon by a 58%-42% margin.

==== State legislator ====
In March 2010, Roorda got in a heated exchange on the House floor with Republican Rep. Tim Jones. While Roorda was speaking critically about the GOP budget proposal, Jones accused him of skipping out on floor votes and called him a liar. The two started shouting and moving toward one another as colleagues kept them apart until the situation calmed down. Both later apologized for their behavior

In 2013 and 2014, Roorda introduced the Thanksgiving Family Protection Act, which would have blocked most retail stores from opening on Thanksgiving Day, saying that "[t]he commercialization of Christmas has now crept into Thanksgiving Day, when folks would like to be home celebrating with their families." This bill did not advance either time.

In 2014, Roorda sponsored a bill that, if passed, would have allowed the government to close "any records and documents pertaining to police shootings [...] if they contain the name of any officer who did the shooting, unless the officer who did the shooting has been charged with a crime as a result of the shooting, in which case such records or documents shall not be closed." The bill did not advance.

==== Running again in 2022 ====
In 2022, Roorda filed to run again for state senate district 22 as a Republican.

=== SLPOA business manager ===
Roorda said the St. Louis Police Officers Association has had concerns about dashboard cameras in use on many city patrol cars and would have the same worries about on-body devices. Roorda said both types of cameras provide video of "one angle of an encounter" that sometimes doesn't reflect exactly what happened. "In general, cameras have been bad for law enforcement and the communities they protect," he said. "It causes constant second-guessing by the courts and the media."

In January 2015, Roorda, wearing an "I am Darren Wilson" bracelet, was involved in a fracas at a meeting of the Board of Aldermen of the City of St. Louis when he had a run-in with a woman as he was approaching and arguing with the aldermen. The woman alleges minor injuries and the union removed Roorda as its spokesperson on matters regarding a proposed Civilian Oversight Board, about which the aforementioned meeting was hearing public testimony. In August 2016 the St. Louis County Police Association terminated its contract with Roorda as business manager, although he continued with the St. Louis city police union. The woman who Roorda allegedly assaulted in 2015 in December 2016 filed a lawsuit against him and in February 2017 the SLPOA was added to the suit.

Leading St. Louis mayoral candidate Lyda Krewson in February 2017 called for Roorda to be fired as city police union representative following a social media post he made against mayoral candidate Tishaura Jones. Jones and other candidates had previously called for the ouster of Roorda.

In 2022, the SLPOA board chose not to renew Roorda's contract.

=== After Michael Brown shooting in Ferguson ===
Roorda has helped with the fundraising for Darren Wilson, the Ferguson police officer who was under investigation for the controversial killing of Michael Brown, and Roorda repeatedly publicly defended Wilson. Roorda made numerous appearances on CNN and other news networks, in interviews and on panels, after the Brown shooting to defend police and criticize protesters, often making controversial statements. He has also written two books: Ferghanistan: The War on Police (JCR Strategic Consultants LLC, November 2015) of which a "generous" portion of the profits was promised to Wilson, and The War on Police: How the Ferguson Effect Is Making America Unsafe (WND Books, November 2016).

Roorda demanded an apology from the NFL following a public display of protest by several members of the St. Louis Rams. Roorda in July 2016 was sharply criticized by the Ethical Society of Police, St. Louis Alderwoman Cara Spencer, and others for an incendiary graphic and remarks about the shooting of officers in Dallas.
