= Ann Moloney =

American politician

Member-elect of the Missouri House of Representatives from the 114th district
- Assuming office January 6, 2027
- Succeeding: Ken Waller

Personal details
- Party: Republican

Ann Moloney is an American politician of the Missouri Republican Party who is the representative-elect for the 114th district in the Missouri House of Representatives. She was elected in the 2026 general election. She was a primary candidate for the district in 2022. She is the mother of nine children, including seven members of the United States Armed Forces.
