= 2010 Jefferson County, Missouri Executive election =

- November 2, 2010

Nominee	Ken Waller	Randy Holman	Dan McCarthy
Party	Republican	Democratic	Libertarian
Popular vote	31,378	29,877	3,680
Percentage	48.32%	46.01%	5.67%
County Executive before election
Position established
Elected County Executive
Ken Waller
Republican

The 2010 Jefferson County, Missouri Executive election took place on November 2, 2010. The 2010 election was the first election for the position after voters approved the County Charter in the 2008 election, which temporarily converted the County Commission into a Board of Executives until the County Executive and a full, seven-member County Council could be elected.

In the Democratic primary, County Assessor Randy Holman defeated Chuck Banks, a member of the Board of Executives, in a landslide. Former County Treasurer Ken Waller won the Republican primary over businessman Avery Fortenberry, and faced Holman in the general election. Waller narrowly defeated Holman, winning 48 percent of the vote to Holman's 46 percent, while Libertarian Dan McCarthy won 6 percent.

== Democratic primary ==
=== Candidates ===
- Randy Holman, County Assessor
- Chuck Banks, member of the Board of Executives

=== Results ===
Democratic primary results
Party	Candidate	Votes	%
Democratic	Randy Holman	9,750	69.53%
Democratic	Chuck Banks	4,273	30.47%
Total votes		14,023	100.00%

== Republican primary ==
=== Candidates ===
- Ken Waller, former County Treasurer
- Avery Fortenberry Barnhart businessman

=== Results ===
Republican primary results
Party	Candidate	Votes	%
Republican	Ken Waller	9,674	76.67%
Republican	Avery Fortenberry	2,944	23.33%
Total votes		12,618	100.00%

== Libertarian primary ==
=== Candidates ===
- Dan McCarthy

=== Results ===
Libertarian primary results
Party	Candidate	Votes	%
Libertarian	Dan McCarthy	144	100.00%
Total votes		144	100.00%

== General election ==
=== Results ===
2010 Jefferson County Executive election
Party	Candidate	Votes	%
Republican	Ken Waller	31,378	48.32%
Democratic	Randy Holman	29,877	46.01%
Libertarian	Dan McCarthy	3,680	5.67%
Total votes		64,935	100.00%
Republican win (new seat)			
