= In Defense of Looting =

Book by American author Vicky Osterweil

In Defense of Looting: A Riotous History of Uncivil Action
- Author: Vicky Osterweil
- Language: English
- Publisher: Bold Type Books
- Publication date: August 20, 2020
- Publication place: United States

In Defense of Looting: A Riotous History of Uncivil Action is a 2020 book authored by Vicky Osterweil and published by Bold Type Books. Osterweil wrote the book in response to the Ferguson unrest in 2014 and 2015.

In the book, Osterweil argues that looting is a valid method of wealth redistribution.

Osterweil denounces nonviolent resistance; she argues that, when non-violence is "pushed as a philosophical, moral, or religious principle, it gains a nasty, authoritarian edge." She also denounces local politicians and political groups who advocate for limiting looting during popular rebellion.

== Criticism ==
In August 2020, Bret Stephens, a columnist for The New York Times, wrote that "In Defense of Looting is not an interesting book. It speaks for almost nobody beyond the fringe left—and certainly not for looters who hadn't thought about 'cisheteropatriarchalism.'"

In a September 2020 review, Graeme Wood, a staff writer for The Atlantic, called the book "The Pinnacle of Looting Apologia", saying that "If the real, lasting change you wish to effect is burning society to cinders and crippling for a generation its ability to serve its poorest citizens, then I suppose I am forced to agree."

== See also ==
- Propaganda of the deed
- Robin Hood
