= Darlena Cunha =

American journalist and writer

- Born: July 9, 1982 (age 44); United States
- Education: University of Connecticut; University of Florida
- Occupations: Journalist; writer

Darlena Cunha (born July 9, 1982) is an American freelance journalist, blogger, and writer. In addition to her career as a journalist, Cunha is an adjunct professor for the College of Journalism and Communications at the University of Florida.

== Life and background ==
Originally from Connecticut, she earned a degree in ecology and another in journalism from the University of Connecticut. She then earned a master's in mass communications from the University of Florida.

Prior to her journalism career, Cunha worked as a television producer in Boston. Beginning in 2010, Cunha also blogged frequently about her motherhood, with several publications noting her as a "mommy blogger". When she announced that she would be quitting mommy blogging in a 2018 article for The Washington Post, she recalled: "By the time my twins were 6, my daily writings had attracted a modest — but sizable, in the smallest sense of the word — following. People were starting to share my work beyond my circles. I had a few memes go viral. I had a few essays make the rounds on news aggregation. I was not a big deal. My kids thought I was. They thought they were."

== Journalism career ==
Darlena Cunha works as a freelance journalist. She has written for The Washington Post, The Atlantic, The Huffington Post, and Time. Her writing is opinionated and liberal; in a 2014 article for The Washington Post she affirms her political beliefs, writing "I'm a diehard, bleeding-heart liberal."

Her first viral article was headlined as "This is what happened when I drove my Mercedes to pick up food stamps" and published in The Washington Post, in 2014. NPR's Tamara Keith wrote that the article "blew up on the Internet in part because of its 'there but for the grace of God go I' quality, in part because it echoes the familiar stereotype, and in part because of [its] striking headline." In contrast to the headline, NPR wrote that Cunha actually enrolled in WIC, not food stamps. Shortly after its publication, the article was listed as a recommended read in The New York Times by Stacy Cowley, who wrote:

When you're poor, looking for work and collecting food stamps, no one expects you to drive a Mercedes. Darlena Cunha's article and video about what happens when you do is a fascinatingly nuanced look at the psychological side-effects of being visibly impoverished.

Cunha became the subject of controversy for a November 2014 Time article about the 2014 Ferguson unrest entitled "Ferguson: In Defense of Rioting." She stated in the article that "Blacks in this country are more apt to riot because they are one of the populations here who still need to. In the case of the 1992 riots, 30 years of black people trying to talk about their struggles of racial profiling and muted, but still vastly unfair, treatment, came to a boil. Sometimes, enough is simply too much. And after that catalyst event, the landscape of southern California changed, and nationally, police forces took note." Cunha was criticized by Fox News for writing that riots are "a necessary part of the evolution of society." In November 2014, Cunha defended the Time column in a radio interview on The Ben Shapiro Show.
