= London Black Revolutionaries =

- Leader: Unknown
- Founded: 2013
- Split from: Socialist Workers Party (UK)
- Ideology: Anti-capitalism; Anti-fascism; Anti-imperialism; Revolutionary socialism Anti-racism
- Political position: Far-left
- Colors: Black, red and white

The London Black Revolutionaries (also known as the London Black Revs, the Black Revs for short) is a revolutionary socialist British political organisation centred in Greater London. The organisation's membership is rumoured to be a mix of Caribbean and South Asian youth, who had been part of an oppositional faction and split of more than 550 members from the Socialist Workers Party (UK) in 2012–13. Its closed membership consists primarily of Black British and British Asian youths, who define themselves as a strictly working-class, grassroots organisation based on anti-racist, anti-fascist, anti-homophobic and anti-sexist principles. Rejecting pacifism, the Black Revolutionaries take a militant approach to their activities, employing direct action as a tactic. The organisation is said to be primarily based in Brixton, South London.

The London Black Revs follows in the development of past Black organisations such as the Black Eagles and the Race Today Collective led by Darcus Howe, a Trinidadian organiser in the Black communities of Notting Hill and Brixton, known for organising a demonstration of 20,000 people in response to the New Cross house fire – a fire (believed by many to be a bombing) of the home of a West Indian family at 439 New Cross Road, Lewisham, South London, that resulted in the deaths of 13 young black persons, aged from 14 to 22, including 27 others were seriously injured – with the New Cross Massacre Action Committee (NCMAC).

== Principles ==
In a 2014 statement the London Black Revs asserted the principles of the organisation:

London Black Revs is a self-determined working class URBAN revolutionary organisation. Our principles and offensives range from anti-racist, anti-sexist, anti-homophobic and anti-fascist campaigns and operations. We are a democratic-militant organisation that encourages self-leadership but strictly adheres to fighting oppression and exploitation in non-abstract forms. We combine practical versatility, modern methods for organising, self-emancipation, direct action, militant defensives and offensives and full commitment to the struggle as cornerstones of London Black Revolutionaries. Our organisation is for those who see nothing else but struggle and will not settle for anything less than a world rid of oppression and exploitation. We see the struggles of race, class, gender and sexuality bound together, as such, they must be fought through the 'united offensive' on oppression.

=== 2013 – 2014/15 ===
==== Fighting Jobbik ====
Stating that it had participated in militant action against Jobbik, a Hungarian far-right nationalist movement, in February 2014, the group has expressed a desire for London to "have the reputation of being a fascist-free zone" by 2015.

==== Concreting of anti-homeless spikes ====
In June 2014 the group launched a "night-time raid", pouring concrete on metal spikes placed outside a Tesco store on Regent Street. According to opponents of the move, the spikes were intended to prevent homeless people from sleeping in the area – according to Tesco, they were "studs aimed at curbing anti-social behaviour".

==== US embassy march ====
On 9 August 2014, the African-American youth Michael Brown was shot dead by a white police officer in Ferguson, Missouri, United States. This caused significant unrest, which restarted on 24 November after a grand jury opted to not indict the police officer. The London Black Revolutionaries, together with other left-wing groups, subsequently organised protest in London against the killing of Brown and the legal action taken in the wake of it.

A protest held on 26 November outside the American embassy in London, organised by London Black Revs and other organisations swelled to over 3000 participants.

==== Westfield die-in protest ====
On 10 December 2014, the London Black Revolutionaries called another demonstration, marking the death of Eric Garner in the United States. More than 800 people joined the die-in solidarity demonstration at one of London's largest shopping centres, White City Westfield's in West London. The demonstration was broadcast by media channels such as RT (formerly known as Russia Today), Press TV and Channel 4. 76 people were arrested, mainly for Violent Disorder following a police kettle outside the Westfield Centre. In an article in The Guardian, London Black Revs stated: "The message is clear: the home secretary and the Metropolitan police will not allow the galvanisation of an active movement against racism, police brutality and wider social and economic problems in the UK."

==== Reclaim Brixton march ====
In 2015, the Black Revs' community organisation saw the initiative of Reclaim Brixton gather more than 2,500 people on the streets of Brixton against the ongoing gentrification and housing crisis in the area. London Black Revs led the street marches around the area in defiance against some local business owners in favour of the changes and developments in Brixton. The event was hailed as a major success and saw thousands of local Brixton residents joining the day's procession.

== See also ==
- British Black Panthers
