= St. Pius X High School (Crystal City, Missouri) =

Private high school in Crystal City, Missouri

St. Pius X Catholic High School

Location
- 1030 St Pius Dr; Crystal City, Jefferson County, Missouri 63028; United States; 38°12′3″N 90°23′36″W

Information
- Type: Private, coeducational
- Religious affiliation: Roman Catholic
- Established: 1959; 67 years ago
- CEEB code: 261087
- NCES School ID: 00752389
- President: Jim Lehn
- Principal: Karen DeCosty
- Grades: 9–12
- Enrollment: 305 (2023–24)
- Student to teacher ratio: 14:1
- Campus type: Suburban
- Colors: Navy and Vegas gold
- Athletics conference: Independent
- Mascot: Sir Lancerlot
- Nickname: StPX
- Team name: Lancers
- Accreditation: Cognia
- Publication: Lancer Legend
- Yearbook: Lance
- Website: stpius.com

St. Pius X Catholic High School is a private Catholic high school in Crystal City, Missouri, a suburb of St. Louis. It is the only Catholic high school in Jefferson County.

St. Pius X opened for the 1959–60 school year after Cardinal Joseph Ritter, at the time archbishop of St. Louis, asked the Adorers of the Blood of Christ to send sisters to staff a new Catholic school high school in the diocese.

== Academics ==
Students have the opportunity to earn dual-enrollment college credit through Saint Louis University and the University of Missouri–St. Louis. In addition, 100 hours of community service are required for graduation, along with a capstone project implemented for the Class of 2021 and beyond.

St. Pius X also offers The Lancer Academy, a unique two-week term class providing students with real-world learning experiences beyond the traditional classroom.

== Athletics and activities ==
St. Pius X competes in the following MSHSAA-sponsored sports and activities:

- Baseball
- Men's and Women's Basketball
- Cheerleading
- Men's and Women's Cross Country (girls took 3rd in the state championship as a team and one girl was state champion in 2020)
- Football
- Men's and Women's Golf
- Men's and Women's Soccer
- Softball
- Men's and Women's Tennis
- Men's and Women's Track & Field
- Women's Volleyball
- Weightlifting
- Men's and Women's Wrestling
- Theatre
- Speech and Debate
- Scholar Bowl

St. Pius X was formerly a member of the Jefferson County Activities Association. On March 6, 2024, members of the association voted to oust St. Pius X from the conference, citing the use of undue influence to recruit at least one student and failing to adhere to conference bylaws.

St. Pius X has won four state championships in women's volleyball: Class 2 in 2011, 2016, and 2017 and Class 4 in 2024. The women's soccer team won the Class 1 state championship in 2012.

== Notable alumni ==
- Steve Stoll (1965), former Democratic Missouri state senator and Congressional candidate
- Mike Henneman (1980), former MLB player
- Paul Wieland (1981), Missouri state senator representing the 22nd District
- Jennifer Johnson Cano (2002), American operatic mezzo-soprano
