= Darren Seals =

American racial justice, anti-police brutality and anti-gun violence activist

Darren Seals Jr. (May 15, 1987 – September 6, 2016) was an American racial justice, anti-police brutality, and anti-gun violence activist from Ferguson, Missouri who worked on the assembly line at General Motors. In September 2016, he was found shot dead in a burning car. St. Louis County Police are investigating his death as a homicide; they have not publicly identified suspects or motives.

== Early life ==
Seals grew up in Ferguson, Missouri, a few blocks from the apartment complex where police officer Darren Wilson shot and killed Michael Brown. Seals had known the Brown family since childhood.

== Activism ==
Seals was active in Ferguson, Missouri, protests in the wake of the police shootings of Brown and Cary Ball Jr., with his commentary appearing in media outlets, per CNN, "as he continued to be outspoken about racial issues after the Brown protests subsided." He co-founded Hands Up United, and The Washington Post described him as "among St. Louis's most prominent anti-police brutality activists."

Seals had survived a shooting in 2013, and attributed his commitment to anti-gun violence activism to that experience.

In 2014, he joined the Fannie Lou Hamer Coalition and helped rally a movement to vote against the Democratic candidate for St. Louis county executive, by backing white Republican candidate Rick Stream. The move in the highly Democratic African American community was an attempt, as The Washington Post described it, to "demonstrate that their votes should not be taken for granted." He was an integral part of this effort. His leadership connected the community and politicians to move 22,000 Democratic votes to the Republican candidate.

After voting for Barack Obama, Seals became a critic of what he saw as the President's insufficient action on many issues including police violence and racial profiling.

Seals was a rapper in St. Louis group D.O.A.; in their song "Born Targets", Seals criticized police response to the Ferguson demonstrations.

Seals was known as "King D Seals" on social media, and referred to himself as a “Businessman, Revolutionary, Activist, Unapologetically BLACK, Afrikan in AmeriKKKa, Fighter, Leader".

In 2022, Riverfront Times published records obtained by activist James Cooper in which the FBI referred to Seals as a "revolutionary who has espoused somewhat militant rhetoric and has access to weapons." The records show the FBI had Seals under surveillance, and had even asked local police to briefly detain him. In the immediate aftermath of his murder, an FBI agent noted that "conspiracy theories are already forming that Seals was killed by the police because of his black lives matter affiliations."

== Death ==
Seals was killed on September 6, 2016, in Riverview, a northern suburb of St. Louis. A homicide investigation revealed he was shot before he was placed in a car, that was later set on fire. Seals' body was recovered approximately 12 miles away from his home. According to his family, Seals had been "terrorized and targeted by the police for months" before his death and believed they were planning to kill him.

Reportedly, a local resident witnessed Seals' jeep being driven by a suspect "who did not know how to drive a clutch transmission". The driver moved the vehicle into the area where it was recovered before leaving in another car, at which point a second man emerged from a nearby bush and set Seals' jeep on fire. No motive for the killing was ever established, nor did police publicly name any suspects.

Media outlets noted "the resemblance of Seals' death to the unsolved killing of Deandre Joshua," another Ferguson resident who was also found shot in a burning car two years earlier, on the night of the announcement a grand jury had not indicted Wilson in Brown's death. Police report that while Joshua's case is still open and active, Seals's death has not been linked to it, nor has a link been ruled out. The Daily Beast found four more cases of similar deaths in St. Louis County in the last two years.

Seals' funeral was held on September 18 at Greater St. Mark Family Church, St. Louis, and was attended by Michael Brown's family.
