= Paul Wieland =

American politician

Member of the Missouri Senate from the 22nd district
- In office January 7, 2015 – January 4, 2023
- Succeeded by: Mary Elizabeth Coleman

Member of the Missouri House of Representatives from the 112th district
- In office January 5, 2011 – January 7, 2015

Personal details
- Born: December 24, 1962 (age 63) Jefferson County, Missouri
- Party: Republican
- Spouse: Terri
- Children: 3

Paul Joseph Wieland (born December 24, 1962) is an American businessman and politician from the state of Missouri. A member of the Republican Party, Wieland represented the 22nd District in the Missouri State Senate starting on January 7, 2015. He left office on January 4, 2023, due to term limits.

== Early life ==
Wieland was raised in Jefferson County, Missouri. He graduated from St. Pius X High School in Crystal City, Missouri. Wieland worked in his family's auto parts business, and then opened his own small businesses.

== Political career ==
During the Jefferson County, Missouri, General Municipal Election, Paul Wieland was a contender, and was elected to join the Jefferson County Health Center Board of Trustees April 3, 2007.

=== Missouri House of Representatives ===
On November 2, 2010, Paul Wieland was elected during the Jefferson County, Missouri, general election for state representative for District 102. Wieland won as a Republican, defeating the Democratic candidate Jeff Roorda, as well as the Constitution Party candidate Richard Blowers.

On November 6, 2012, Paul Wieland was elected during the Jefferson County, Missouri, general election running for state representative of District 112. Wieland, won as a Republican, defeating Democratic candidate Daniel E. James.

=== Missouri Senate ===
On November 4, 2014, Paul Wieland was elected during the Jefferson County, Missouri, general election running for state senator for the twenty-second district. Wieland, won as a Republican, defeating Democratic candidate Jeff Roorda.

=== Opposition to contraception ===
In August 2013, Wieland and his wife filed a lawsuit against the United States Department of Health and Human Services, the Department of the Treasury, and the Department of Labor, saying that in applying for health insurance as a government employee, he was not given the chance to opt out of coverage for contraceptives and abortifacients because of a provision in the Affordable Care Act. He lost the case in District Court in October 2013, but appealed the decision to the United States Court of Appeals for the Eighth Circuit based on the Burwell v. Hobby Lobby decision by the United States Supreme Court. and in July 2016 won their appeal on the basis of the Religious Freedom Restoration Act.

In 2021, Wieland proposed legislation that would prohibit Medicaid coverage for certain forms of contraception which, in his view, would destroy fetal life.

== Personal life ==
Wieland and his wife, Terri, live in Imperial, Missouri, and have three daughters. Paul and Terri own the Wieland Insurance Group. He is a devout Catholic.
