= Ferguson unrest =

Aftermath of the shooting of Michael Brown

- Part of the Black Lives Matter movement and reactions to the Killing of Michael Brown
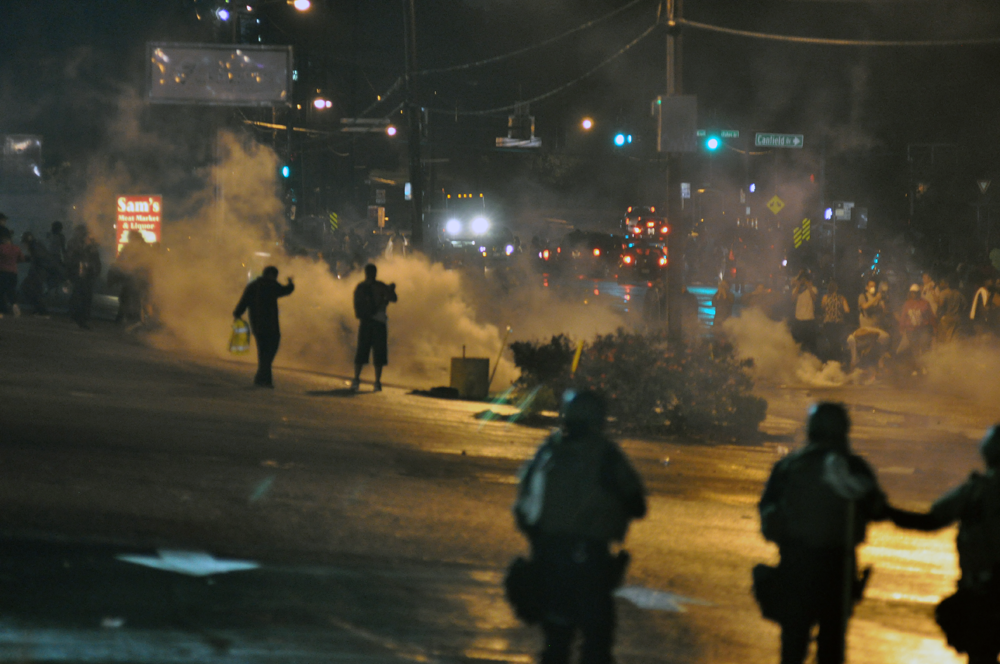
- Police officers using tear gas on protesters
- Date: First wave: August 10–25, 2014; Second wave: November 24 – December 2, 2014; Third wave: August 9–11, 2015
- Location: Ferguson, Missouri, U.S., and St. Louis, Missouri, U.S.
- Caused by: First wave: Killing of Michael Brown; Second wave: Darren Wilson not indicted Third wave: Anniversary of shooting
- Methods: Widespread rioting, vandalism, looting, arson, and gunfire on Sunday night, followed by 375 days of largely non-violent protests.

Arrests and injuries
- Deaths: None
- Injuries: 10 members of the public injured 6 police officers injured
- Arrested: 321 members of the public

The Ferguson unrest (sometimes called the Ferguson uprising, Ferguson protests, or the Ferguson riots) was a series of protests and riots which began in Ferguson, Missouri, on August 10, 2014, the day after the fatal shooting of Michael Brown by FPD officer Darren Wilson. The unrest sparked a vigorous debate in the United States about the relationship between law enforcement officers and Black Americans, the militarization of police, and the use-of-force law in Missouri and nationwide. Continuing activism expanded the issues by including modern-day debtors prisons, for-profit policing, and school segregation.

As the details of the shooting emerged, police established curfews and deployed riot squads in anticipation of unrest. Along with peaceful protests, there was a significant amount of looting and violence in the vicinity of the site of the shooting, as well as across the city. Media criticism of the militarization of the police in Ferguson after the shooting was frequent. The unrest continued on November 24, 2014, after a grand jury did not indict Officer Wilson. It briefly flared again on the first anniversary of Brown's shooting. The Department of Justice (DOJ) concluded that Wilson shot Brown in self-defense.

In response to the shooting and the subsequent unrest, the DOJ conducted an investigation into the policing practices of the Ferguson Police Department (FPD). In March 2015, the DOJ announced that they had determined that the FPD had engaged in misconduct against the citizenry of Ferguson by, among other things, discriminating against African Americans and applying racial stereotypes in a "pattern or practice of unlawful conduct". The DOJ also found that the Ferguson city council relied on fines and other charges generated by police for funding municipal services.

== Background ==
Michael Brown, an 18-year-old African-American male, was shot and killed during an encounter with Officer Darren Wilson. Officer Wilson arrived after a robbery and assault was reported at a nearby convenience store. The caller described the accused (later identified as Michael Brown from security cameras). Officer Wilson's account was that after seeing Brown and Brown's friend Dorian Johnson walking home in the middle of the street he asked them to walk on the sidewalk instead. When they refused Wilson noticed that Brown's shirt and a box of cigarillos he was holding matched the description from the robbery call, and suspected Brown and Johnson as being involved. When he attempted to question Michael Brown, he was attacked. There was a struggle, Brown attempting and almost succeeding in gaining possession of Officer Wilson's weapon. Due to the struggle, the weapon discharged, slightly wounding Brown, who then fled. Wilson gave brief chase firing upon Brown, ultimately shooting and killing Brown when Brown turned to confront him and, upon Wilson's account, charged at him. The officer was a 28-year-old white male Ferguson police officer. After several months of deliberation, a grand jury decided not to indict Officer Wilson for any criminal charges in relation to the incident.

The police response to the shooting was heavily criticized, as was the slow rate of information making its way out to the public. Many of the documents received and reviewed by the Grand Jury were released when the grand jury declined to indict Officer Wilson.

== Events ==
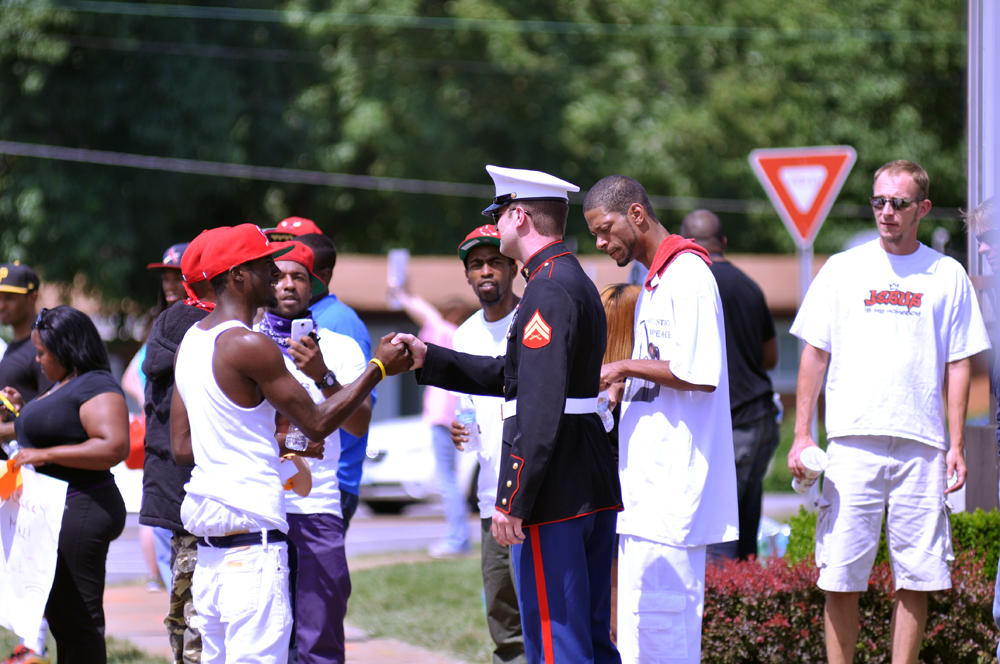
A U.S. Marine offers words of encouragement to protesters.

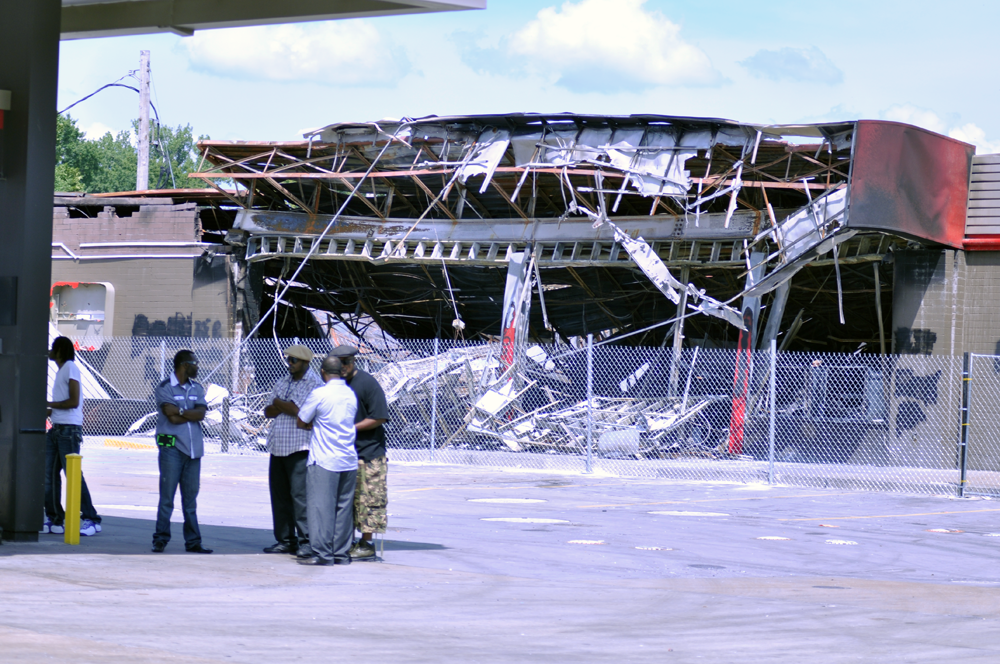
The looted, burned-out QuikTrip gas station in Ferguson

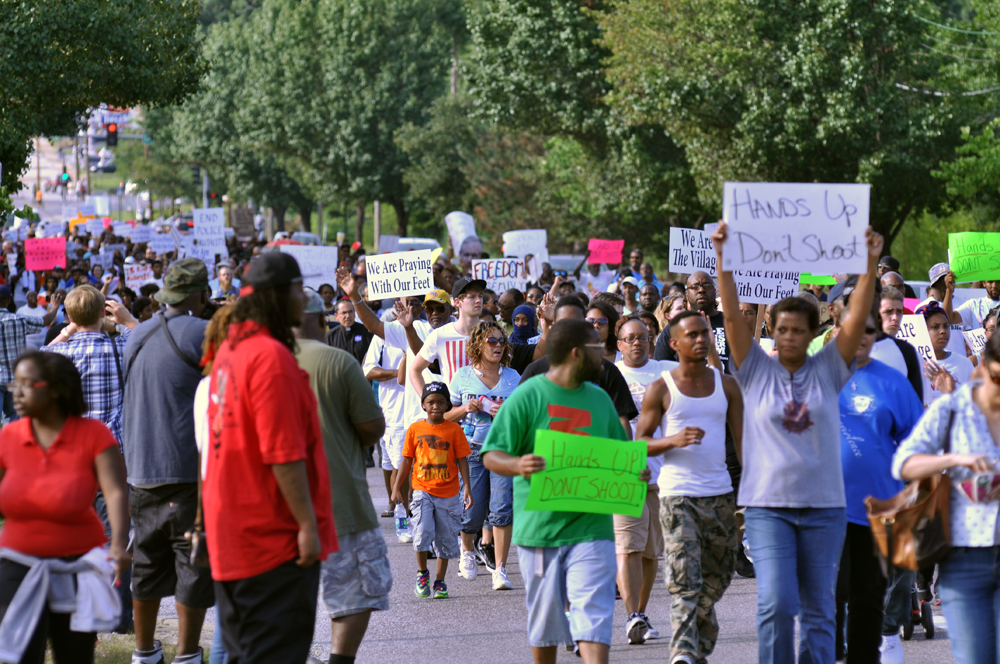
Protests at Ferguson on August 14, 2014

=== August 2014 ===
On August 9, the evening of the shooting, residents had created a makeshift memorial of flowers and candles in the spot where Brown died. According to Mother Jones, an unidentified police officer allowed a police dog to urinate on the memorial and police vehicles later crushed the memorial. Mother Jones reported that these incidents inflamed tensions among bystanders, according to Missourian state representative Sharon Pace, who told the reporters for the magazine, "That made people in the crowd mad and it made me mad."

On August 10, a day of memorials began peacefully, but some people became unruly after an evening candlelight vigil. Local police stations assembled approximately 150 officers in riot gear. Some people began looting businesses, vandalizing vehicles, and confronting police officers who sought to block off access to several areas of the city. At least 12 businesses were looted or vandalized and a QuikTrip convenience store and gas station was set on fire, as well as a Little Caesars. The Quiktrip looting was captured on video by activist Umar Lee leading to over 30 arrests. Many windows were broken and several nearby businesses closed on Monday. The people arrested face charges of assault, burglary, and theft. Police used a variety of equipment, including riot gear and helicopters, to disperse the crowd by 2:00 a.m. Two police officers suffered minor injuries during the events.

On August 11, police fired tear gas to disperse a crowd at the burnt shell of the QuikTrip convenience store, set on fire by looters the night before. According to reports, gunshots were fired in Ferguson and five people were arrested. Some protesters threw rocks at police officers. The police responded by firing tear gas and bean bag rounds at protesters which included Missouri Senate member Maria Chappelle-Nadal.

On August 12, several hundred protesters gathered in Clayton, the county seat, seeking criminal prosecution of the officer involved in the shooting. Protesters in Ferguson carried signs and many held their hands in the air while shouting "don't shoot," apparently in response to later discredited eye-witness accounts that Brown had his hands raised in an attempt to surrender at the moment he was shot. According to police, some protesters threw bottles at the officers, prompting the use of tear gas to disperse the crowd. The following day, a SWAT team of around 70 officers arrived at a protest demanding that protesters disperse. That night, police used smoke bombs, flash grenades, rubber bullets, and tear gas to disperse the crowd. Video footage of the events recorded by KARG Argus Radio shows Ferguson Police firing tear gas into a residential neighborhood and ordering the journalist to cease recording.

Between August 12 and 13, police officers at times fired tear gas and rubber bullets at lines of protesters and reporters. At least seven protesters were arrested on the evening of August 12 and 13 after police told protesters to "go home" or face arrest. CNN cameras filmed an officer addressing a group of protesters by saying "Bring it, you fucking animals, bring it." On the night of August 12, a peaceful protester was shot in the head non-fatally by an unknown assailant. The gunshot survivor, Mya Aaten-White, complained that police had failed to interview her in connection with the shooting. Police had attempted to interview Aaten-White alone, but she refused to speak with them without an attorney present. A month after the shooting, Aaten-White's attorney indicated that he had subsequently contacted police to set up an appointment for an interview, without response. City officials refused to provide reporters with ballistics reports or other investigative records, citing state law regarding ongoing police investigations.

As night fell on August 13, protesters threw projectiles at police including Molotov cocktails, and police launched tear gas and smoke bombs in retaliation. While police were clearing a McDonald's restaurant, The Washington Post reporter Wesley Lowery and The Huffington Post reporter Ryan J. Reilly were arrested. Officers reportedly asked them to leave first, gave them a 45-second countdown when they were not moving fast enough, and ultimately resorted to more forceful measures to remove people from the McDonald's. "Officers slammed me into a fountain soda machine because I was confused about which door they were asking me to walk out of," Lowery said. Martin Baron, executive editor of The Washington Post, issued a statement, saying "there was absolutely no justification for Wesley Lowery's arrest," and that the police behavior "was wholly unwarranted and an assault on the freedom of the press to cover the news."

Al Jazeera America journalists including correspondent Ash-har Quraishi covering the protests in Ferguson on Wednesday night were also tear-gassed and shot at with rubber bullets by a police SWAT team. An officer was captured on video turning the reporters' video camera toward the ground and dismantling their equipment. Al Jazeera America issued a statement, calling the incident an "egregious assault on the freedom of the press that was clearly intended to have a chilling effect on our ability to cover this important story." On Thursday, August 14, the St. Charles County Regional SWAT Team put out a press release stating that "... the SWAT Team has not been any part of attempting to prevent media coverage" and that the SWAT team had helped journalists move their equipment at their request. A raw video captured a vehicle marked clearly as "St. Charles County SWAT" rolling up to the Al Jazeera lights and camera and taking them down.

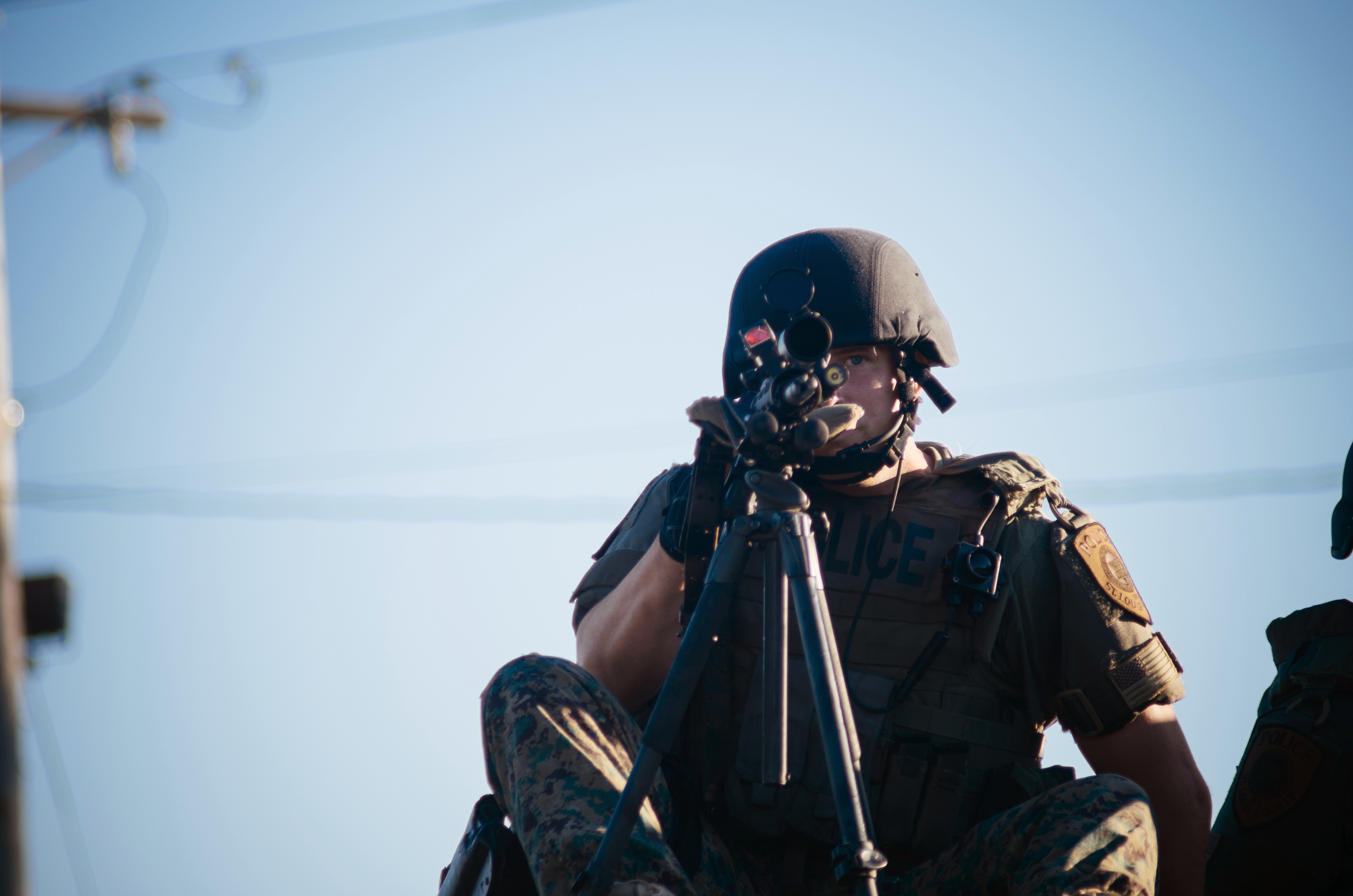
A police marksman posted atop armored vehicle

Tom Jackson, the Ferguson police chief denied any suppression of the media. U.S. President Barack Obama addressed the First Amendment violations, saying, "There's also no excuse for police to use excessive force against peaceful protests, or to throw protesters in jail for lawfully exercising their First Amendment rights. And here, in the United States of America, police should not be bullying or arresting journalists who are just trying to do their jobs and report to the American people on what they see on the ground."

St. Louis alderman Antonio French, who was documenting the protests for social media, was also arrested by police in Ferguson on Wednesday night. French said that he went into his car to escape tear gas and smoke bombs being thrown by police. While he was in his car, police approached him, dragging him out of the car. French was arrested for unlawful assembly. Speaking to reporters after his release from jail on Thursday, French described the dozen or so other people arrested as "peacekeepers" including "reverends, young people organizing the peace effort." No charges were ultimately brought against French.

The Reporters Committee for Freedom of the Press (RCFP), a large coalition of media and press freedom groups, wrote to police forces in Ferguson, Missouri, to protest the harassment of journalists covering the protests.

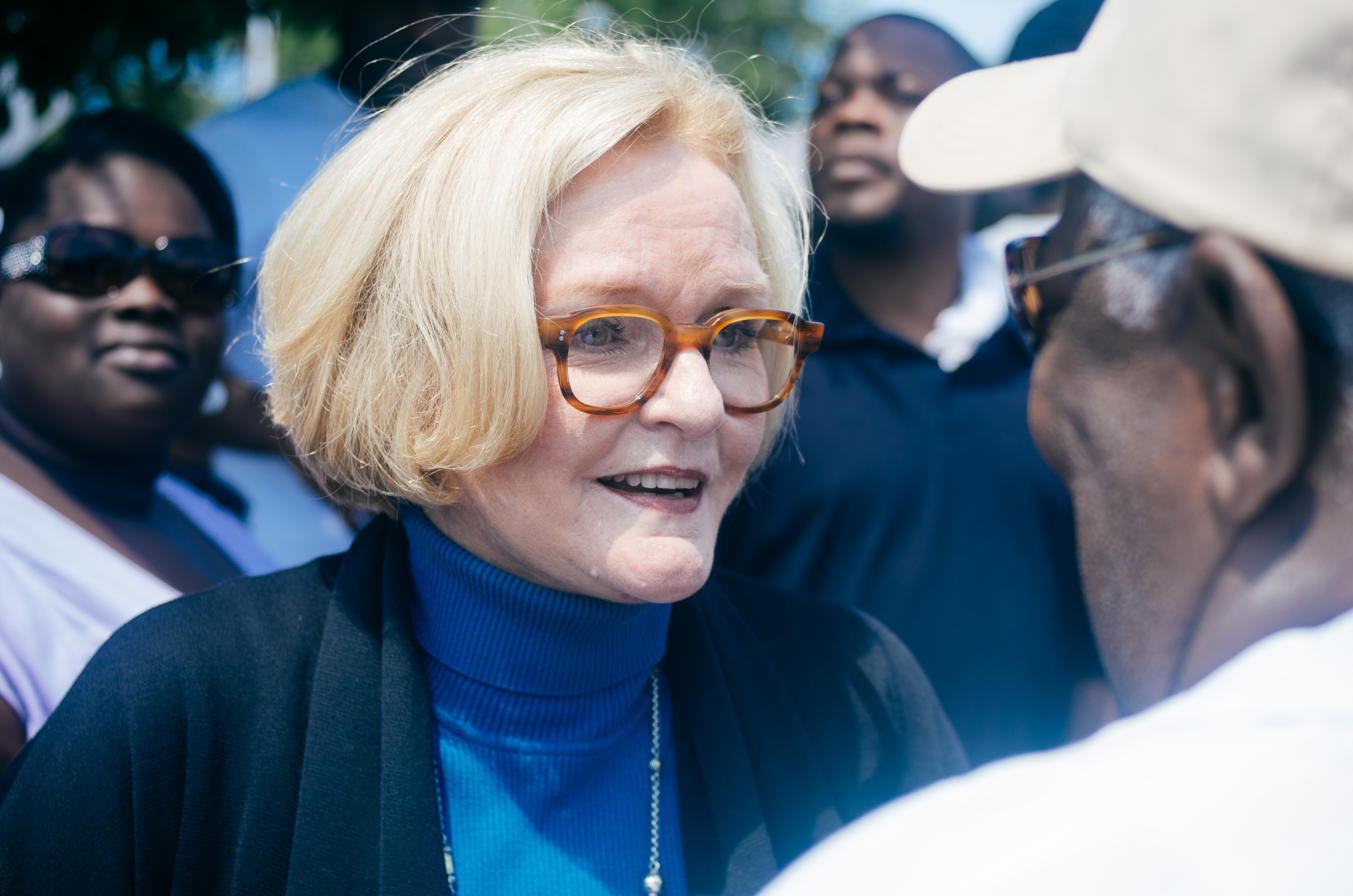
United States Senator Claire McCaskill (D-MO) talking to protesters in Ferguson

On August 14, United States Senator Claire McCaskill (D-MO) stated that "militarization of the police escalated the protesters' response." St. Louis Chief of Police Sam Dotson stated he would not have employed military-style policing such as that which transpired. According to Chief Dotson, "My gut told me what I was seeing were not tactics that I would use in the city and I would never put officers in situations that I would not do myself." Another reason Dotson did not want the city and county police to collaborate was because of the history of racial profiling by police in that county. In an email to a St. Louis Alderman who brought up concerns of racial profiling, he wrote: "I agree and removed our tactical assistance. We did not send tactical resources to Ferguson on Tuesday or Wednesday. Our only assistance was that of four traffic officers to help divert traffic and keep both pedestrians and motorists safe. On Thursday we will have no officers assisting Ferguson."

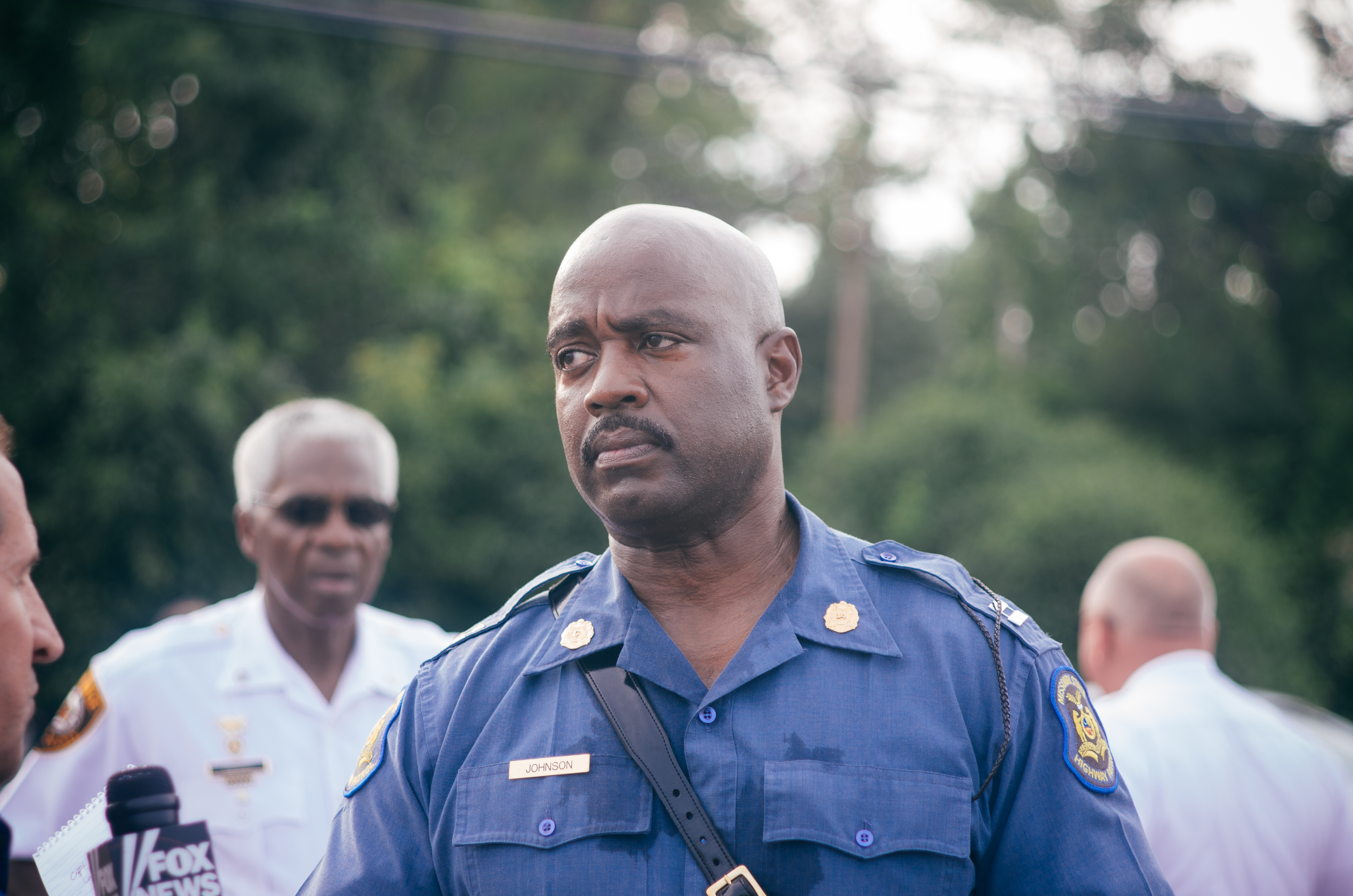
Missouri Highway Patrol Captain Ronald S. Johnson was asked to take over law enforcement jurisdiction at Ferguson

Missouri Governor Jay Nixon said at a press conference that the Missouri State Highway Patrol would take over policing Ferguson from the St. Louis County police, whose tactics were widely criticized, referring to the change as "an operational shift," and that police will use force "only when necessary," and will generally "step back a little bit." Nixon said that Ferguson security would be overseen by Captain Ron Johnson of the Highway Patrol. Johnson, an African-American, said he grew up in the community and "it means a lot to me personally that we break this cycle of violence." Nixon said, "The people of Ferguson want their streets to be free of intimidation and fear" he said, but during the past few days, "it looked a little bit more like a war zone and that's not acceptable." St. Louis county prosecutor Robert P. McCulloch criticized the governor's decision, saying "It's shameful what he did today; he had no legal authority to do that. To denigrate the men and women of the county police department is shameful."

In the evening hours of August 14, Captain Johnson walked with and led a large, peaceful march in Ferguson.

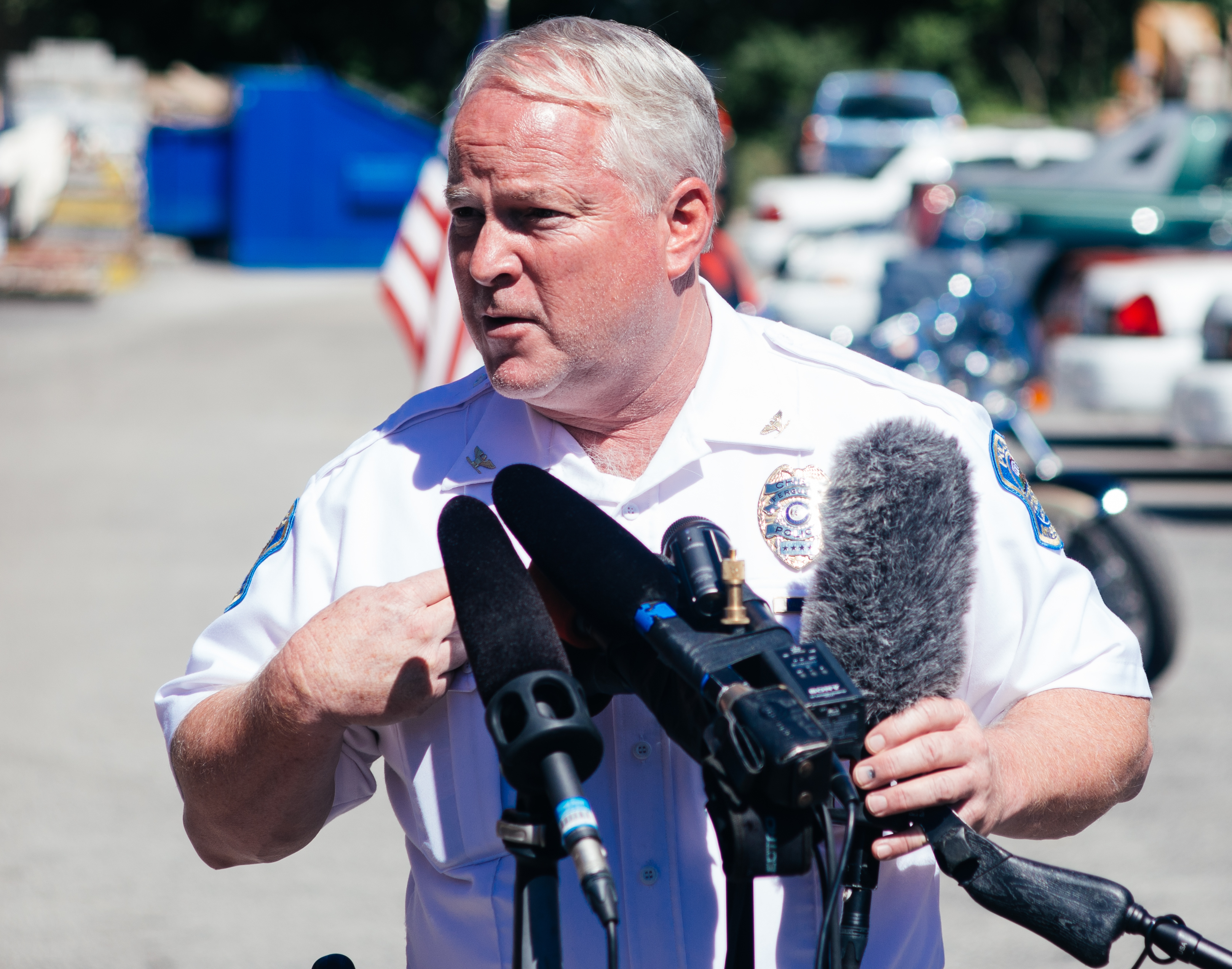
Ferguson Police Chief Tom Jackson at the August 14, 2014 news conference

Ferguson Police Chief Tom Jackson announced the name of the officer involved in the shooting in a news conference the morning of Friday, August 15, nearly a week after the officer shot Brown on Saturday afternoon. Jackson prefaced the name announcement by describing a "strong-arm" robbery that had occurred a few minutes before the shooting at a nearby convenience store called Ferguson Market & Liquor. A police report released to members of the media at the news conference described Brown as the suspect involved in the robbery. Hours later, Jackson held another news conference in which he said Wilson wasn't aware of the robbery when he stopped Brown.

On Friday night, protests continued in "an almost celebratory manner" near the QuikTrip until police arrived at around 11:00 p.m. At around 1:30 a.m. Saturday morning, rioters broke into and looted the Ferguson Market & Liquor store that Brown allegedly robbed prior to his shooting, as well as other nearby businesses; after the initial break-in, a group of protesters and observers gathered near the storefronts of the looted businesses in an attempt to prevent further looting.

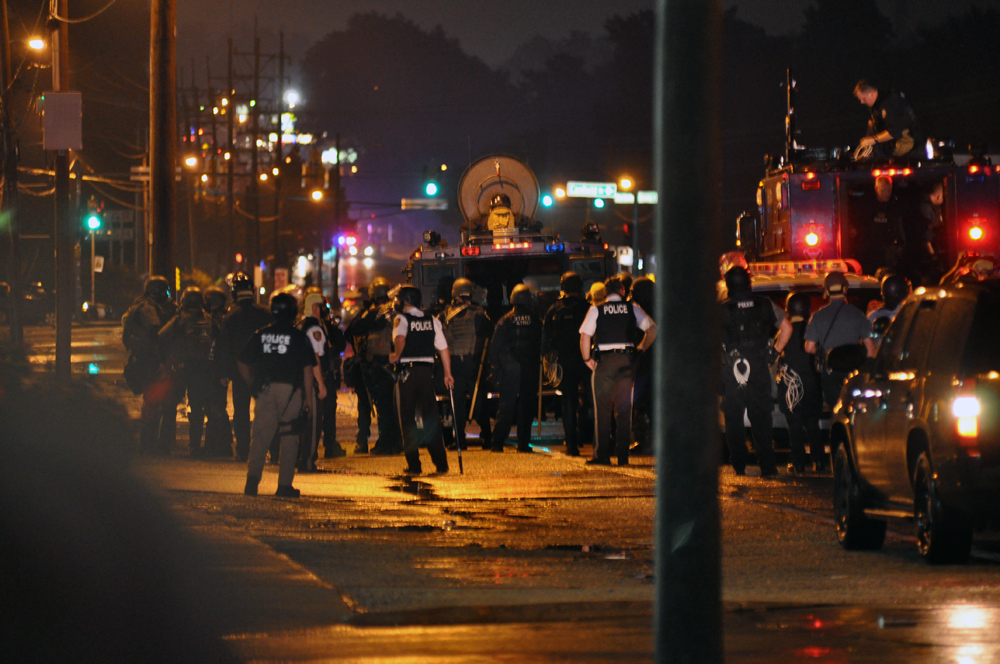
Law enforcement responding to civil unrest, August 17, 2014

As a result of looting and disruption the night before, on August 16, Nixon declared in a press conference a state of emergency and implemented nightly curfews in Ferguson from midnight to 5:00 a.m. Some residents at the press conference said that law enforcement officers had instigated the violence with their military-like tactics. Johnson said that police would not enforce the curfew with armored trucks and tear gas, and that police will communicate with protesters and give them time and opportunity to leave before curfew.

In the early hours of August 17, tear gas and tactical units were used, despite prior assurances. One of the protesters was shot and critically wounded; police have claimed that they did not fire any shots. Seven other individuals were arrested. Later that morning, a Missouri Highway Patrol spokesman announced that the curfew would be extended for a second day.

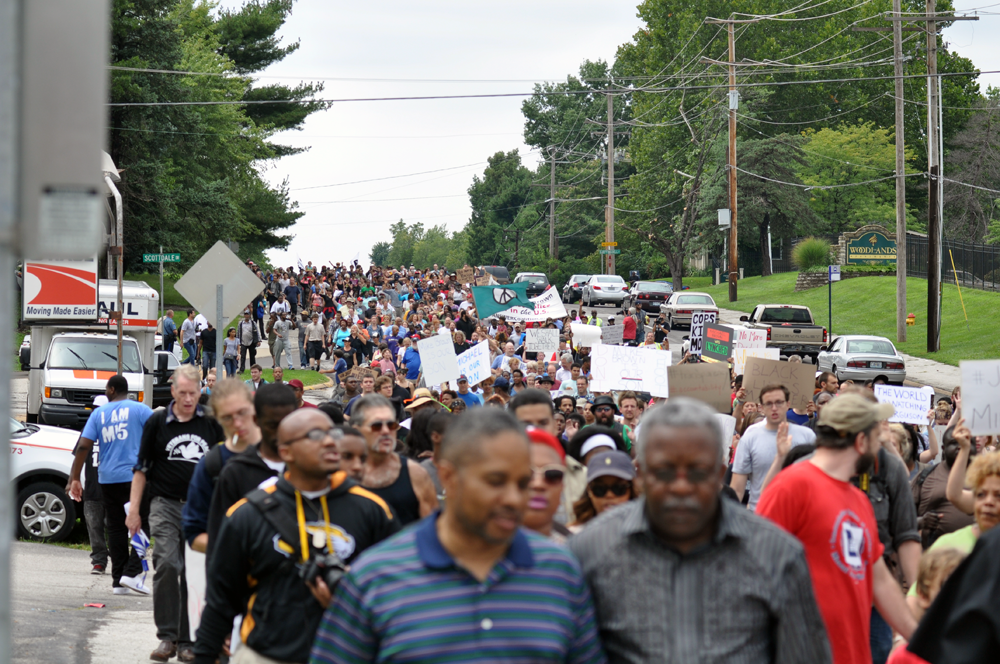
Protests at Ferguson on August 17, 2014

On August 18, after violent clashes during the imposed curfew, Nixon issued an executive order calling in the National Guard to "help restore peace and order and to protect the citizens of Ferguson." Nixon also announced that there would be no curfew on the night of August 18. Amnesty International sent a 13-person contingent of human rights activists to seek meetings with officials as well as to train local activists in non-violent protest methods. Police were recorded threatening the media with mace. A photojournalist, Scott Olson, was also arrested by officers. After being briefed by Attorney General Eric Holder on the events, President Obama dispatched Holder to Ferguson to monitor the unrest there.

On the night of August 18, after several hundred protesters, some of whom were seen throwing bottles, charged toward a wall of police 60 wide and five deep, members of the crowd pushed them back including clergymen and community leaders locking arms, averting a more serious confrontation. 78 individuals were arrested, including The Intercept's Ryan Devereaux. German journalists Ansgar Graw and Frank Hermann reported being placed under arrest by an unidentified officer who would only identify himself as "Donald Duck."

On August 20, Attorney General Eric Holder traveled to Ferguson, where he met with residents as well as Brown's family. Only six individuals were arrested, compared to 47 arrests the prior night. Nixon then withdrew the National Guard from Ferguson on August 21 after witnessing improvements among the social unrest. On August 23, protests continued to be peaceful, although three more arrests were made. During the same day, a rally of 50 to 70 people was held in Ferguson in support of Wilson under the banner "I am Darren Wilson," and as of August 25, nearly US$400,000 were raised by supporters in an online crowdfunding campaign. The online campaign drew a number of racist comments, which forced the website to shut down the comment section.

Brown's family asked that supporters suspend their protests for one day out of respect for the funeral proceedings, planned for August 25. "All I want tomorrow is peace while we lay our son to rest. Please, that's all I ask," Brown's father said. The service was attended by thousands of people, including 2,500 filling the sanctuary, and others in an overflow auditorium which was also full. An estimated 2,000 additional people were on church property for the funeral. Eric Davis, one of Brown's cousins, said at the funeral, "[s]how up at the voting booths. Let your voices be heard, and let everyone know that we have had enough of all of this."

=== September 2014 ===
Early on September 23, a memorial to Michael Brown on Canfield Drive burned to the ground. Protesters gathered at the site. The burned memorial was set up again.

That evening, several hundred protesters gathered, asking for Jackson's resignation. In front of the police headquarters, protected by 50 police officers Jackson addressed the protest and started to explain that changes were underway after Brown's killing, creating some agitation in the crowd. Within minutes, police officers intervened to protect their chief. Several protesters were arrested and later the protest was declared unlawful.

On September 26, the Department of Justice's Civil Rights Division asked Jackson to prohibit police officers from wearing "I am Darren Wilson" bracelets when on duty. In a previous letter earlier that week, it had asked that police officers wear nametags.

On the evening of September 28, a large crowd protested. Bottles and rocks were thrown at officers. Support from other police forces was requested. Eight protesters were arrested for failure to disperse and resisting arrest charges.

On September 29, protesters gathered in front of the police building, including a dozen clergy members who prayed in the police parking. They were told that they would be arrested if they did not clear the street. A clergyman was then arrested. Protesters were also told that they would be arrested if the chants went on after 11:00 p.m. About that time, police moved slowly forward, but protesters refused to move backwards. As they were almost in contact, gunshots were heard, and both sides backed up. Later, Capt. Ron Johnson of the Missouri Highway Patrol told the crowd that the "five-second rule" would not be implemented and there would be no arrest as long as the protest remained peaceful.

=== October 2014 ===
On October 2, St. Louis County Police and Missouri State Highway Patrol arrested more than a dozen people including Mary Moore, a freelance journalist who has worked for CNN and local activists Ashley Yates, Alexis Templeton and Brittany Ferrell. Protesters were charged with offenses that included failure to comply with police, noise ordinance violations and resisting arrest. They had to wear orange jumpsuits. Bonds were highest at $2,700, then reduced to $1,000. Police dismantled an encampment that lasted a few weeks on West Florissant. Police and protesters are adapting constantly to the other side's moves ("It's a legal clinic on these streets."). The city has recently raised bonds from $100 to $1,000.

On October 3, Ferguson police chief Thomas Jackson ceded responsibility for managing protests in the city to the St. Louis County police department. The limited resources of Ferguson police made it difficult to handle daily protests after their resumption the previous week.

On October 4, about 50 protesters briefly delayed a concert of the St. Louis Symphony Orchestra. Just before the performance resumed after intermission, they started singing an old civil rights tune, unfurled three hand-painted banners and scattered paper hearts that read: "Requiem for Mike Brown." After that, they left the building peacefully.

On Monday evening, October 6, after a game between the St. Louis Cardinals and the Los Angeles Dodgers, baseball supporters and protesters had a chanting battle outside the stadium.

A website, Ferguson October, as well as other organizations, planned a massive week of resistance throughout the St. Louis metropolitan area. The event, Ferguson October, began on Friday afternoon when protesters peacefully marched to County Prosecutor Bob McCulloch's office in Clayton, Missouri. Later, until around 2:30 a.m., mostly peaceful protests took place in Ferguson and the Shaw neighborhood. As many as 400 people took to the streets on Friday night. On October 9, 2014, Ferguson October sparked the activation of the St. Louis County Emergency Center in anticipation. Police were also working longer shifts and the Missouri National Guard could have been activated if needed.

On October 12, a Ferguson October rally and service was held at Chaifetz Arena, located on Saint Louis University's campus. The stated purpose of the event was to "call on the nation to repent for the sin of police brutality and support a new generation of youth activists." Activists Suheir Hammad, Ashley Yates and Tef Poe spoke to the crowd along with Christian, Jewish, and Muslim clergy members. Younger activists criticized older activists for not being radical enough. When the keynote speaker, Cornel West, took the stage, he said, "I didn't come here to give a speech. I came here to go to jail!"

On October 13, protesters attempted to cross police lines to meet with officers at the Ferguson Police Department. Dozens of protesters, estimated to be over 50, were arrested, during a staged and peaceful act of disobedience, including clergy and Cornel West. Saint Louis University became hosts to peaceful protesters around the Clock Tower, located near the library and is essentially the center of the campus. The protesters staged a sit in with over 250 people attending.

On October 20, Missouri Senator Jamilah Nasheed was arrested in front of the Ferguson Police Department building for blocking traffic in the street and not respecting police orders. She was taken into custody, along with a man who was accompanying her, and refused bond. At the time of her arrest she was carrying a handgun.

=== November 2014 ===
On November 17, the governor of Missouri declared a state of emergency in anticipation of protests in Ferguson following the announcement of the results of the grand jury.

On November 21, two members of the New Black Panther Party were arrested for buying explosives they planned to detonate during protests. The same pair is also indicted for purchasing two pistols under false pretenses.

On November 22, Journalist Trey Yingst was arrested in front of the Ferguson Police Department. He later filed a lawsuit with the ACLU and won an $8,500 settlement.

On November 24, the grand jury decided not to indict Wilson in the shooting death of Brown. Following the announcement of the grand jury's decision, Michael Brown's stepfather Louis Head yelled to the crowd of protesters in front of the police department: "Burn this bitch down!" There were peaceful protests as well as rioting. A dozen buildings were burned down; there was gunfire, looting, vandalism, and destruction of two St. Louis County Police patrol cars, as well as burning of various non-police cars.

On November 25, the body of 20-year-old DeAndre Joshua was found inside a parked car within a few blocks of where Brown was killed. Police initially classified the death as suspicious, later ruling it a homicide. The man had been shot in the head and burned. That same day, CNN reported that thousands of people rallied to protest the grand jury's decision in more than 170 U.S. cities from Boston to Los Angeles, and that National Guard forces were reinforced at Ferguson to prevent the situation from escalating. At least 90 people were arrested for arson, looting, and vandalism in Oakland, California. Protests also took place internationally, with demonstrations held in several major cities in Canada and in London, United Kingdom. Calls by protesters to disrupt the Black Friday shopping day, which took place the Friday after the grand jury decision, were heeded in the St. Louis region, with hundreds of demonstrators blocking walkways and shouting slogans at the Saint Louis Galleria and other area shopping centers.

On November 27, Governor Nixon reportedly rejected calls for a new grand jury to decide whether to charge Wilson over Brown's killing.

=== December 2014 ===
On December 2, an armed militia associated with the Oath Keepers watched community members on Ferguson roofs, even after the police told them to stop doing so.

=== March 2015 ===
On the night of March 11, 2015, around 12:00 a.m. CST, protests ensued throughout the city of Ferguson following the announcement of the chief of police's resignation. Under a mutual separation agreement, police chief Thomas Jackson would be paid one year of annual salary (nearly $96,000) with health benefits, with his resignation effective March 19. Lieutenant Colonel Al Eickhoff was declared acting chief pending the hiring of a replacement. According to a report by Susan Weich of the St. Louis Post-Dispatch, there were two sets of protesters, one chanting clean slogans, and the other, "volatile, angry, hurling profanities at the police, media and other protesters."

In the early morning hours of March 12, two police officers were shot outside the Ferguson police station. Though approximately 100 protesters remained on the other side of South Florissant Road adjacent to the police line, witnesses believed the shooter was on the top of a hill approximately 220 yards from the police station. A 41-year-old officer from the St. Louis County Police Department was hit in the shoulder, and a 32-year-old officer from the Webster Groves Police Department was hit in the cheek. The St. Louis County police chief said that at least three shots were fired parallel to the ground rather than up into the air (not "skip shots") and therefore assumed his officers were the target. An "intense manhunt" was launched for the person or persons responsible for the shooting.

On March 14, 20-year-old Jeffrey L. Williams was arrested in connection with the shooting.

=== April 2015 ===
On April 29, protests resumed in the wake of the death of Freddie Gray in Baltimore, Maryland. Two people were shot in the neck and a third was shot in the leg, with all three victims being in stable condition. Six people were arrested, one for shooting one of the victims and five for looting a Mobil gas station. Four police cars were damaged after rocks were thrown at them. Several items were also set on fire.

=== August 2015 ===
On August 9, the anniversary of Brown's fatal shooting, peaceful demonstrations occurred and attendants observed four-and-a-half minutes of silence, signifying the four-and-a-half hours during which Brown's body was left on the street.

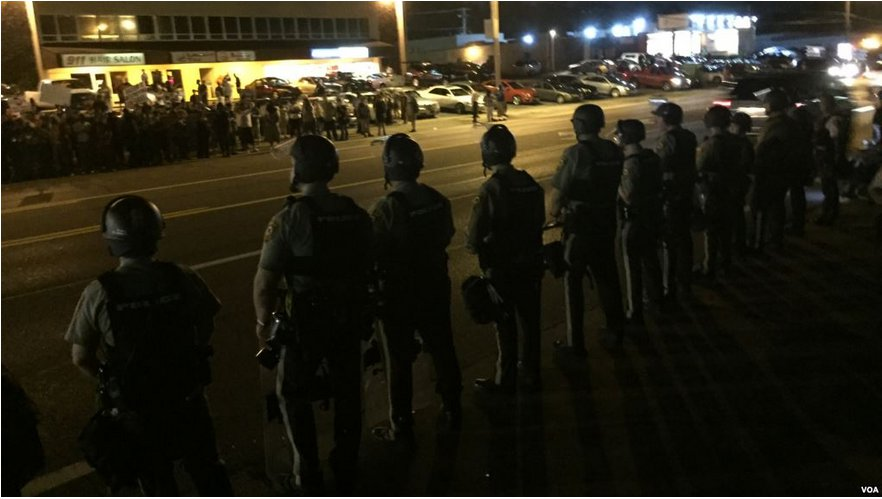
Police and protesters on August 10, 2015

Later on in the night, two groups of suspected looters began firing at each other during a demonstration. Four plain-clothed officers in an unmarked sports utility vehicle responded to the scene. There, they shot a man who allegedly opened fire on them with a stolen 9mm SIG Sauer handgun. The suspect, identified as Tyrone Harris Jr., was hospitalized in "critical and unstable" condition. Three hours after the shooting, two teenagers were wounded in an apparent drive-by shooting as they were walking near a memorial dedicated to Brown. A journalist was also attacked and robbed in a parking lot, while three police officers were injured by protesters.

Following the violence, officials placed St. Louis County under a state of emergency on August 10, which was lifted three days later. Protests continued that day and into the night, with one such event shutting down Interstate 70. More than 100 protesters were arrested during the demonstrations. Early in the morning of August 11, more than 20 additional protesters were arrested. Later that day, police released video footage of Harris' shooting. Harris would then be charged with four counts of assault on law enforcement in the first degree, five counts of armed criminal action, and one count of discharging or shooting a firearm at a motor vehicle.

=== August 2016 ===
On the second anniversary of Michael Brown's death, mourners decided to hold a protest by blocking a road way. A vehicle later drove through the protesters hitting one and knocking them into the air. Protesters then began to shoot at the fleeing vehicle. The injured protester was later brought to a hospital and the driver cooperated with police.

== Related incidents ==
=== Ray Albers ===
St. Ann police officer Ray Albers, who was suspended for pointing his rifle at peaceful protesters

Ray Albers of the St. Ann Police Department was suspended indefinitely from his duties after an incident at a protest in Ferguson that was captured on video. According to St. Louis County police, he pointed a semi-automatic service rifle at peaceful protesters while using profanity and threatening to kill them.

Albers was recorded on video saying, "I will fucking kill you." When asked to identify himself, Albers replied, "Go fuck yourself." This led the ACLU to write to law enforcement demanding action. A repercussion of his actions was that while his identification was pending, Albers was widely referred to on social media as Officer Go Fuck Yourself.

Albers resigned eight days later on August 28, 2014.

=== Kajieme Powell ===
Four miles from Ferguson, 25-year-old Kajieme Powell was killed by police gunfire in the early afternoon of August 19, 2014. It had been reported to the St Louis Police Department that Powell was behaving in an erratic manner, carrying a knife. Upon arriving at the scene police officers ordered Powell to drop to the ground before shooting him dead when he took a step towards them. Twelve shots were fired in total; one witness described the level of force used as "excessive". Demonstrators were ready to engage in protest and the event was given due immediate coverage by the media. Kajieme Powell was born in 1990.

St Louis police released several video and audio recordings of the shooting on 21 August.

=== Dan Page ===
On August 22, St. Louis County Police officer Dan Page, who was filmed pushing CNN's Don Lemon, was relieved of duty after a video emerged of an inflammatory speech Page had given to the St. Louis and St. Charles chapter of the Oath Keepers. He retired three days later.

=== Matthew Pappert ===
Glendale police officer Matthew Pappert, who had patrolled in Ferguson during the protests, was suspended for controversial postings to Facebook, such as "[t]hese protesters should have been put down like a rabid dog the first night" and "[w]here is a Muslim with a backpack when you need him?" (referring to the Boston Marathon bombings). Journalists in Ferguson claimed Pappert had threatened them. Pappert was ultimately fired from the department after the conclusion of an internal investigation.

=== Lawsuit against police and local governments ===
A $40 million federal lawsuit was filed on August 28 by five protesters who were arrested between August 11–13. It alleges that police officers used unnecessary force and made unjustified arrests. Four more protesters were added as plaintiffs in October. The lawsuit lists various police officials, officers, the Ferguson city government and the St. Louis county government as defendants.

=== Vonderrit Myers Jr. ===
On October 8, 2014, Vonderrit Myers Jr. was shot and killed by an off-duty police officer in Shaw, St. Louis. Police said he had a gun and shot at them. Doug Hollis of St. Louis, a relative of both Myers and Michael Brown, did not witness the shooting but told USA Today that Myers was unarmed, with only a sandwich in his hands, and suggested that the gun found at the scene might have been planted by police. Following the shooting, there were multiple nights of protests. Forensic evidence later confirmed that Myers had gunshot residue on his right hand, shirt, and pants, indicating that he had fired a gun. Three bullets fired at police matched Myers's gun. The family's attorney noticed that police versions differ about the weapon Myers allegedly used: first, police mentioned a 9mm Ruger, and later a 9mm Smith & Wesson. It was later determined that Myers did have a gun and it matched the same gun he was seen with in various photos posted to social media. An independent autopsy by Dr. Cyril H. Wecht found that six of the eight wounds were at the back of the body. Police investigators served Wecht with a subpoena for his results. The funeral was held on October 26.

On May 19, 2015, it was announced that no charges would be filed against the off-duty police officer. St. Louis Circuit Attorney Jennifer Joyce's report says the officer shot and killed Myers in self-defense after Myers fired a gun at him, and thus a criminal violation could not be proven beyond a reasonable doubt in the resulting death.

=== Antonio Martin ===
On December 23, 2014, 18-year-old Antonio Martin was shot and killed in Berkeley, Missouri after pulling a gun on a St. Louis County police officer who was questioning him. The incident immediately provoked a clash between protesters and police officers.

=== Joshua Williams ===
During the protests following Martin's death, 18-year-old Joshua Williams was arrested for lighting a fire at the QuikTrip station on North Hanley. Williams had emerged as a young leader in the Ferguson protests and had been previously arrested and released on bail without prison time. He was released briefly in 2015, was taken back into custody in violation of parole at age 19. His sentence for 8 years in prison was longer than other Missouri cases with greater damage, and activists asserted that the judge wanted to "make an example" of Williams.

=== Jeffrey L. Williams ===
On March 14, 2015, Jeffrey L. Williams, age 20, was arrested in connection with the shooting of two police officers two days earlier (see above). Williams, who is black and was on probation for possession of stolen property, had admitted to firing the shots but said that he was not aiming at police. According to Williams' attorney, he intended to retaliate against a person who had robbed him earlier that day. Police recovered a .40-caliber handgun that matched the spent cartridges found at the crime scene. On April 1, the Associated Press reported that during phone conversations, Williams confessed to firing back at an unidentified person who was shooting at him during the March 12 protest. His attorney had previously claimed Williams never discharged a firearm during the shooting. Arraigned on June 3, Williams pleaded not guilty to all charges. In December 2016, a jury found Williams guilty of two counts of first-degree assault, three counts of armed criminal action and one count of unlawful use of a weapon. He was sentenced to 25 years in prison on March 17, 2017.

=== Tyrone Harris Jr. ===
On August 9, 2015, the anniversary of Brown's shooting, Tyrone Harris Jr., age 18, was shot by four plain-clothed police officers during a gunfight between looters (see above). He was hospitalized in critical condition. Police charged him with four counts of first-degree assault on law enforcement, five counts of armed criminal action, and one count of discharging a firearm at a motor vehicle. Harris was held on a $250,000 cash-only bond. According to Harris' father, he graduated from the same high school as Brown and was a close friend of his. Two days after the shooting, police released surveillance video of Harris firing a gun at an unmarked police car. Harris was out on bond for felony charges related to the theft of a vehicle and a gun at the time of the incident. Despite video evidence, Harris' father denied that his son had a gun. Others in Ferguson said that Harris might not have known he was firing at an unmarked police car.

On the night that Harris was shot, a free benefit concert to raise money for the family of Brown was sponsored by Activist/Rapper Talib Kweli. Kweli along with Academy Award winner Common, and other members of the Black Lives Matter movement were present. Harris was shot while the concert took place. The event and subsequent protest were filmed and organized into an award-winning short documentary entitled #Bars4Justice directed by multi-media activists Queen Muhammad Ali and Hakeem Khaaliq. The film won best short film at the 24th annual Pan African Film Festival in 2016.

== Later deaths of protestors ==
As of March 2019, Ferguson protesters have continued to receive threats to their lives or wellbeing. A number have died under circumstances viewed as suspicious by the community. Continuing mistrust between the police and the community may have resulted in the police failing to adequately investigate these deaths.

On September 6, 2016, Darren Seals, a leader in the Ferguson protests, was found shot and killed inside a burning car, similarly to DeAndre Joshua; he was 29 years old. Edward Crawford, known for an iconic photograph of him throwing a tear gas canister during the protests, also died in 2017 after an apparent suicide, according to police. A number of media outlets had reported that Crawford had thrown the canister at police; however, he later told the St. Louis Post-Dispatch that he was throwing it away from children in the crowd. Dorian Johnson, a friend of Michael Brown who was with him when he was shot and who was also the protestor whose account of the shooting popularized the "hands up, don't shoot" slogan and gesture used in the Ferguson protests, was shot dead on September 7, 2025. The shooter of Johnson, who was identified as both a woman and someone who was not a police officer, would be arrested, but was soon afterwards released and not criminally charged after the shooting was accepted to have been in self defense. Nevertheless, the investigation into Johnson's death remains ongoing.

== Related developments ==
=== Town hall meetings ===
In order to develop a dialogue between authorities and residents, a series of five town meetings in October and November were set up by City leaders. The DOJ's Community Relations Service was involved, and the meetings were closed to the media and non-residents.

=== Voter registration ===
It was reported that 3,200 inhabitants (out of 21,000) had registered to vote in Ferguson since Michael Brown's death. Later, the election board stated that the released numbers were inaccurate and only 128 new voter registrations occurred. The larger number was the total number of interactions with Ferguson voters, including address changes or other alterations.

=== Ferguson PR sub-contractor fired ===
Devin James, a minority PR person hired shortly before the unrest began, was fired by the St. Louis Economic Development Partnership after his prior record came to light. James worked directly with the Ferguson Police Chief and seems to be the one who suggested the video apology, among other things. The Partnership was informed that James served a 90-day work farm sentence in 2009 for reckless homicide. As a victim of an armed robbery in 2004, he shot 8 times and killed one of his two assailants. Earlier in 2004, he was shot in the shoulder as a victim of another armed robbery. After a troubled youth, James managed to attend university, but the two robberies prevented him from obtaining a degree. James kept his position on a pro bono basis.

=== Injunction against "keep moving" rule at peaceful protests ===
On September 29, 2014, the ACLU asked a federal court to order police to stop using the "keep moving" rule during protests in Ferguson, which prevented people from standing still under threat of arrest. St. Louis County Police Chief Jon Belmar testified that the rule was meant to be used for the most volatile night protests during curfew and was mistakenly used by some officers at calm protests during the day. On October 6, Chief Judge Catherine D. Perry, of the United States District Court for the Eastern District of Missouri, ruled that "The practice of requiring peaceful demonstrators and others to walk, rather than stand still, violates the constitution," and issued an injunction against the practice for peaceful, law-abiding protesters in Ferguson.

=== Rebuilding process ===
The QuikTrip that was looted and burned during the first night of unrest was rebuilt as a job training center as part of the Urban League of Metropolitan St. Louis's "empowering communities" effort. The center, which houses a "Save Our Sons" program, opened on July 26, 2017. St. Louis area companies contributed $1.2 million toward the effort, meant to give young jobless or underemployed men a month's training before matching them with area jobs.

=== Philanthropy help ===
Wanting to aid the healing process of the wounded city, an anonymous couple called the Greater Saint Louis Community Foundation and set up a $100,000 fund. But the generous couple didn't know which programs or initiatives would best help Ferguson, so they requested that a racially balanced group of Ferguson residents make the decision on how to distribute the money.

The Come Together Ferguson grant committee—made up of pairs of black and white teachers, police officers, pastors, and residents—decided to award the first round of grants to Ferguson summer youth programs. On Saturday, May 23, 2015, the committee announced it would distribute $39,000 to eleven organizations, selected out of 42 applications.

=== New police chief named ===
Delrish Moss, a former Miami police officer with decades of experience related to public relations and community outreach, was appointed police chief in April 2016. Major Moss, who is black, was sworn in on May 9, 2016, to lead the primarily white police force in protecting a community where over half of residents are African American. Moss resigned from his position in October 2018 to return to Miami.

== Racial context ==
The Washington Post noted that racial disparities had already existed between the Ferguson Police Department and its citizenry, which had experienced significant demographic changes since 2000. Protests, vandalism, and other forms of social unrest continued for more than a week, and the violence escalated despite the imposition of a night curfew. Several of the stores looted during the unrest are Asian American-owned. The Daily Beast wrote that Asian-Americans tend to be "left out" of the race relations discussion.

Also according to The Washington Post, the Ferguson Police Department "bears little demographic resemblance" to the mostly African-American community, which already harbored "suspicions of the law enforcement agency" preceding Brown's shooting, with 48 of the police force's 53 officers being white, while the population is only one-third white and about two-thirds black. The community had experienced rapid demographic change in recent years; in 2000, just over half of the population was black. An annual report last year by the office of Missouri's attorney general concluded that Ferguson police were "twice as likely to arrest African Americans during traffic stops as they were whites."

The Los Angeles Times argued that the situation that exploded in Ferguson "has been building for decades," stating that the protesters initially came from the town as well as from neighboring towns that have pockets of poverty, the poorest towns in St. Louis, and it also argued that "the growing challenge of the suburbanization of poverty" was the catalyst of the unrest.

Time magazine argued that "Blacks in this country are more apt to riot because they are one of the populations here which still needs to riot. In the case of the 1992 riots, 30 years of black people trying to talk about their struggles against racial profiling are muted, but their reaction to still vastly unfair, treatment, came to a boil. Sometimes, enough is simply too much. And after that catalyst event, the landscape of southern California changed, and nationally, police forces took note."

Another aspect of this situation might stem from a system that burdens the poor and black in Ferguson. Minor traffic offenses are the starting point, and the costs spiral up rapidly if the offenders do not pay the fines on time or do not appear in court. The income from court fines represented the second-largest source of revenue for Ferguson in 2013. On October 1, 2014, the city of St. Louis canceled 220,000 arrest warrants and gave a three-month delay to the offenders to get a new court date before the warrants would be reissued.

== Reactions ==
=== In the United States ===
==== Federal government ====
- On August 12, citing an incident where a St. Louis County Police Department helicopter was fired on from the ground, the FAA implemented a no-fly zone over Ferguson. Recordings of telephone conversations between FAA employees later revealed that the true reason the flight restrictions were requested was to keep news helicopters out of the area during the protest violence. The tapes were obtained by the Associated Press in a Freedom of Information Act (FOIA) request.
- In an August 14 op-ed in Time Magazine, U.S. Senator Rand Paul (R-Kentucky) said that police forces need to be demilitarized and that "[t]he shooting of 18-year-old Michael Brown is an awful tragedy" and that "Anyone who thinks race does not skew the application of criminal justice in this country is just not paying close enough attention."
- Senator Elizabeth Warren (D-Massachusetts) and Representative Justin Amash (R-Michigan) tweeted similar descriptions of Ferguson as a "war zone" in the aftermath of the police actions of August 12, with Amash calling the situation "frightening" on August 13 and Warren demanding answers on August 14.
- On August 23, U.S. President Barack Obama ordered a review of the distribution of military hardware to state and local police, questioning the use of such equipment during the racial unrest in Ferguson. The review will be led by White House staff and includes the Domestic Policy Council, the National Security Council, the Office of Management and Budget, as well as other agencies including the Department of Defense, Homeland Security, the Justice Department, and the Treasury Department, in coordination with Congress. Attorney General Eric Holder said in a statement to The New York Times that "it makes sense to take a look at whether military-style equipment is being acquired for the right purposes and whether there is proper training on when and how to deploy it" and that "[d]isplays of force in response to mostly peaceful demonstrations can be counterproductive."
- On September 4, Eric Holder announced that the Justice Department will investigate Ferguson police force for possible misconduct or discrimination, saying, "We have determined that there is cause for the Justice Department to open an investigation to determine whether Ferguson police officials have engaged in a pattern or practice of violations of the U.S. Constitution or federal law." Attorney General Holder indicated that an overhaul similar to a recent agreement with the Albuquerque police department over use of excessive force could be called for in Ferguson. "It's pretty clear that the need for wholesale change in that department is appropriate," Holder said.
- On September 24 at the United Nations General Assembly, President Obama described the racial tensions at Ferguson as a failure to live up to America's ideals, and said, "In a summer marked by instability in the Middle East and Eastern Europe, I know the world also took notice of the small American city of Ferguson, Missouri – where a young man was killed, and a community was divided. So yes, we have our own racial and ethnic tensions."
- On November 24, minutes after a prosecuting attorney announced that a grand jury decided not to indict police officer Darren Wilson, President Obama urged calm and restraint in Ferguson, saying racial discrimination and distrust of police cannot be resolved by "throwing bottles." Immediately after the shooting and in the weeks leading up to the grand jury announcement, President Obama has made several such calls for calm and restraint in Ferguson.
- On November 24, after reports of gunshots fired into the sky in Ferguson, the FAA diverted some flights to other airports that were inbound to St. Louis. Departures were not affected. The Temporary Flight Restriction said that no news helicopters or commercial flights were allowed in a three-mile radius up to an altitude of 3000 feet.

==== Supreme Court Justices ====
Justice Ruth Bader Ginsburg said in an August 22 interview with The National Law Journal that the events at Ferguson and the stop-and-frisk policies in New York City, point to a "real racial problem" in the U.S. Additionally, Justice Sonia Sotomayor cited the Department of Justice's "Ferguson Report" extensively in her dissent in the 2016 Fourth-Amendment case Utah v. Strieff as evidence of systemic racial bias in police practice.

==== Missouri government ====
- On August 14, Governor of Missouri Jay Nixon stated that the Ferguson riots were "deeply challenging" and "promised 'operational shifts' to ease the situation, using the Missouri State Highway Patrol to direct security.
- Maria Chappelle-Nadal, a Missouri Senator who represented parts of Ferguson and was tear-gassed during the demonstrations, said in an interview that "It doesn't matter if Michael Brown committed theft or not. That's not the issue. The issue is what happened when Darren Wilson encountered Michael Brown, and when he died—when he was killed. Those are the only facts that are necessary."
- James Knowles III, the Mayor of Ferguson, was slow to seek support and coordination from state and county authorities as violence and civil unrest developed in his municipality. Mayor Knowles did not receive a phone call from either the Governor or others as riots developed and even as others came on the scene, no one appeared to take charge.

==== Local authorities ====
- Jennings, Missouri: On August 11, in response to safety concerns, the school district in nearby Jennings cancelled the first day of classes.
- Ferguson-Florissant School District, Missouri: On August 13, in response to the continuing unrest in the community, Ferguson-Florissant schools that were to open Thursday were closed and scheduled to reopen on Monday. On Sunday Aug 17, the school district again cancelled the first day of classes due to ongoing unrest. On Monday, administrators for the district announced that school would continue to be closed through the end of the school week.
- On August 12, Metropolitan Police Department, City of St. Louis Commissioner of Police Sam Dotson decided against providing any more manpower to Ferguson owing to concerns about the welfare of the protesters and the handling of the situation by local police.
- On September 1, it was reported that, after receiving a large amount of criticism regarding their practices, the police force in Ferguson had begun to wear body cameras. The cameras had been donated to the police by two private security firms.

==== Brown family ====
- One of Brown's cousins released a statement saying that "the stealing and breaking in stores is not what Mike will want, it is very upsetting to me and my family." The statement also said, "Our family didn't ask for this but for justice and peace."
- After the grand jury's decision was announced, Brown's mother, Lesley McSpadden, speaking to a crowd, expressed feelings of disbelief and innocence. Brown's stepfather, Louis Head, turned to a crowd of demonstrators who had gathered, and yelled, "Burn this motherfucker down" and "Burn this bitch down," according to a New York Times video. He later apologized for his outburst.

==== Polls ====
A Pew Research poll conducted August 14–17 among 1,000 adults, found stark racial and political divisions in reactions to the shooting. By about four-to-one, African Americans (80% to 18%) said the shooting raised important issues about race, while whites, by 47% to 37%, said the issue of race is getting more attention than it deserves. The divide in public opinion was also observed across partisan lines, with 68% of Democrats (including 62% of white Democrats) believing the incident raises important issues about race that merit discussion, compared with 40% of Independents and 22% of Republicans. Republicans were also more likely than Democrats to view the police response as appropriate (43%), compared with 21% of Democrats; 65% of Republicans expressed confidence in the investigations into the incident, compared with 38% of Democrats.

==== Third parties ====
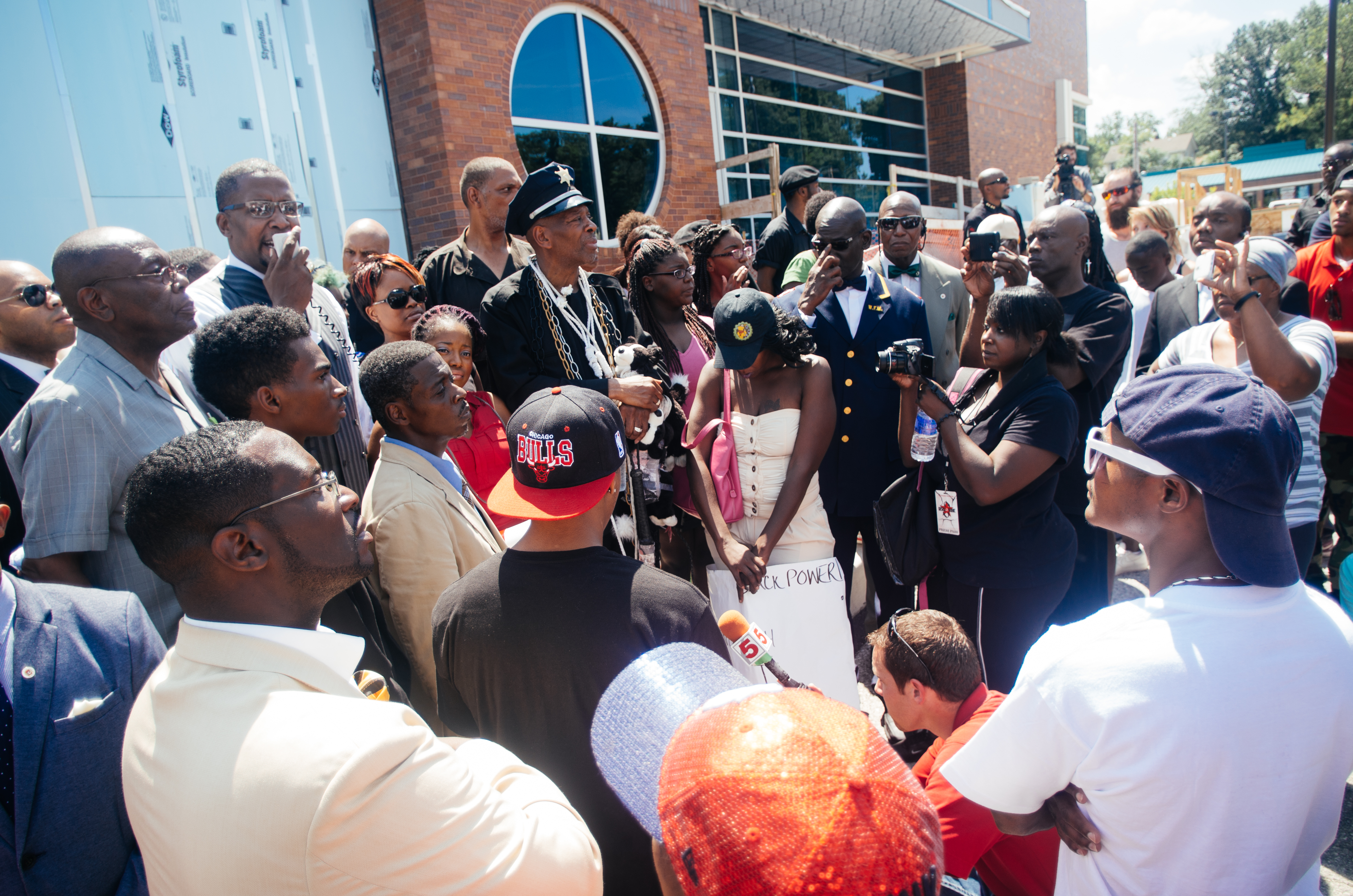
Protestors gather at the Ferguson police department

- As of December 28, 2014, at least 253 demonstrations had been held worldwide for Michael Brown or in solidarity with Ferguson.
- Local pastors held a vigil on the morning of Sunday, August 10. Another vigil was planned on the same day, at 8:00 p.m. in the area where Brown was killed.
- National vigils and marches occurred on the evening of Thursday, August 14, in over 100 cities around the U.S. with thousands in attendance. They were organized by FeministaJones, using Twitter and the #NMOS14 hashtag.
- Hacktivists claiming an association with Anonymous and operating under the codename "Operation Ferguson" organized cyberprotests by setting up a website and a Twitter account. The group promised that if any protesters were harassed or harmed, they would attack the city's servers and computers, taking them offline. City officials said that e-mail systems were targeted and phones died, while the Internet crashed at the City Hall. Prior to August 15, members of Anonymous corresponding with Mother Jones said that they were working on confirming the identity of the undisclosed police officer who shot Brown and would release his name as soon as they did. On August 14, Anonymous posted on its Twitter feed what it claimed was the name of the officer involved in the shooting. However, police said the identity released by Anonymous was incorrect. Twitter subsequently suspended the Anonymous account from its service.
- A group of Tibetan monks joined the protesters in Ferguson on Sunday, August 17.
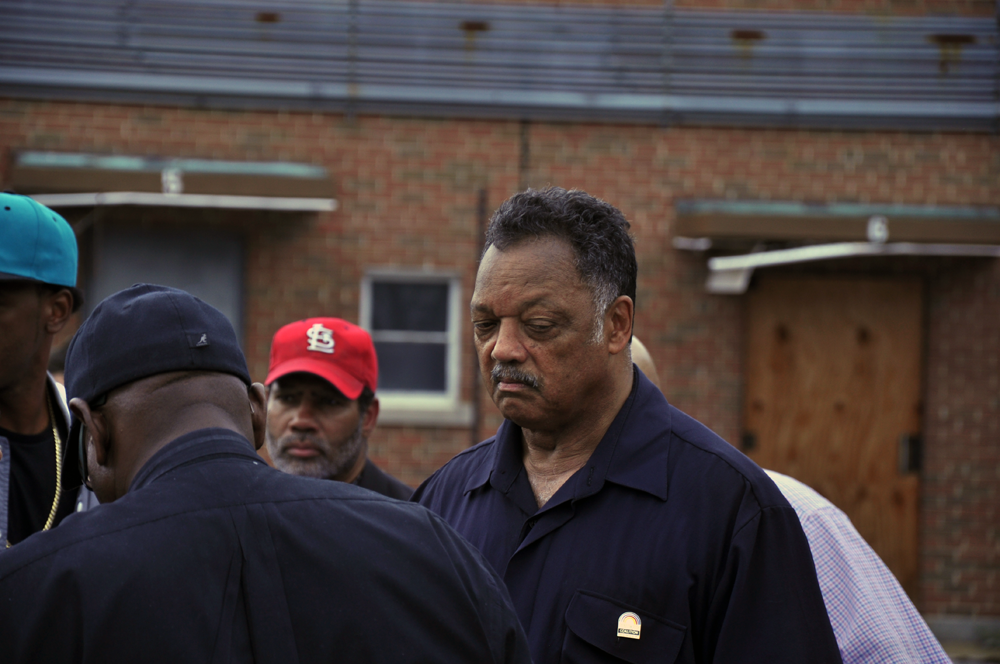
  Civil rights leader Reverend Jesse Jackson in Ferguson, August 17, 2014
- On August 17, about 150 people protested in downtown St. Louis in support of Darren Wilson. The protesters argued that Wilson had been victimized and that any punishment for him would cause law enforcement officers to be "frightened to do their jobs."
- CNN, along with ABC News and others, described the incident as having triggered a national debate on race relations, as well as the use of force and the militarization of the police in the United States.
- The Green Shadow Cabinet, a group led by 2012 Green Party presidential nominee Dr. Jill Stein, stated on August 14 that "[a] healthy response by the local police and government agencies in Ferguson and St. Louis County would have been to immediately announce a full investigation of the shooting and a review of police policies and practices."
- Some veterans of the U.S. Armed Forces criticized the tactics and procedures used by the police during the unrest, including the use of assault rifles in a protest situation. They also criticized the choice to use canine units, which played into racial imagery exacerbating the issue and encouraged engaging the civilian population in dialogue and social media.
- On September 22, protesters received support from a California-based group called We Copwatch to improve the way they record their interactions with the police.
- In October 2014, members of the Emerson Unitarian Universalist Chapel in the primarily white St. Louis suburb of Chesterfield, Missouri, held its first Black Lives Matter vigil to honor Michael Brown. The group evolved into the West County Community Action Network (WE CAN), a grassroots organization that holds weekly Black Lives Matter vigils in visible locations in primarily white portions of St. Louis County, Missouri. The organization advocates about various Calls to Action of the Ferguson Commission Report, Forward Through Ferguson: A Path Toward Racial Equity, a 2015 analysis that highlighted structural contributions to inequity in the region and ways to address them. The group's efforts, focused in the western area of the county, include working to dismantle the school-to-prison pipeline, promoting racial equity in police work, and advocating about racially equitable voting rights. Members of the group are also poised to respond to racist acts in the area.
- St. Louis Rams wide receiver Kenny Britt led his teammates Tavon Austin, Jared Cook, Stedman Bailey, and Chris Givens in giving the "Hands up, Don't shoot." gesture when walking on to the field prior to the November 30 contest against the Oakland Raiders. The five came under fire from several media outlets, including Mike Ditka, who called the display "embarrassing."

=== International reactions ===
- China – The Chinese state news Xinhua News Agency said hours before the governor ordered National Guard troops into Ferguson, "Obviously, what the United States needs to do is to concentrate on solving its own problems rather than always pointing fingers at others."
- Egypt – Its Ministry of Foreign Affairs stressed that it agrees with calls for "self restraint and respect for the right of assembly and peaceful expression of opinion" in the protests, hoping that the American authorities deal with the protests according to "the international standards." Egypt's Foreign Ministry Spokesman said that Egypt is closely following up with the "mounting protests" in Ferguson.
- France – French Minister of Justice Christiane Taubira commented on Radio France Internationale, "I will not make value judgements on the institutions of the United States but when the sense of frustration is that strong, that deep, that long-lasting and that huge, there is reason to question whether people trust these institutions. You realise that somehow it only happens to the same people: Afro-American kids. Certain clichés still persist, certain prejudices which can create terrible reflexes." She also tweeted in French "Michael Brown, racial profiling, social exclusion, territorial segregation, cultural relegation, weapons, fear, fatal cocktail." Taking a line of the song I Shot the Sheriff by Bob Marley, she added: "Kill them before they grow?."
- Iran – The Islamic Republic News Agency commented, "Violence has become institutionalized in the U.S. in recent years, but since President Obama, the 2009 Nobel Peace Prize winner, came to the White House, the violence has intensified, and now it has erupted against blacks in Ferguson."
- North Korea – called the United States a "human rights graveyard," the "laughingstock of the world," and "a country wantonly violating the human rights where people are subject to discrimination and humiliation due to their race and are seized with such horror that they do not know when they are [going to be] shot to death."
- Russia – The Russian Foreign Ministry stated, "Our American partners [have] to pay more attention to restoring order in their own country before imposing their dubious experience on other nations" and that the U.S. "has positioned itself as a 'bastion of human rights' and is actively engaged in 'export of democracy' on a systematic basis," but that "serious violations of basic human rights and barbaric practices thrive" in the country.
- Turkey – The Turkish Foreign Ministry criticized the U.S. police for detaining a correspondent of the state Anadolu news agency while he covered protests in Ferguson, Missouri, calling it unacceptable and against the freedom of press.

=== Others ===
- From August 14 to 22, Amnesty International USA had a team of human rights observers, trainers and researchers in Ferguson. It included organizers to train activists in the use of non-violent protests. This was the first time that Amnesty International has deployed such a team to the United States. In a subsequent report of October 24, 2014, they expressed concerns for human rights in Ferguson, related to the use of lethal force in the death of Brown, racial discrimination and excessive use of police force, imposition of restrictions on the rights to protest, intimidation of protesters, the use of tear gas, rubber bullets and long range acoustic devices, restrictions imposed on the media covering the protests, and lack of accountability for law enforcement policing protests.
- In Palestine, people from Gaza and other Palestinian cities expressed their support for the protestors in Ferguson and shared tips on how to deal with tear gas and police violence, noting the weapons fired in Ferguson come from companies that supply Israel. The PFLP released an official statement of solidarity with Ferguson, acknowledging the ties between the Palestinian struggle to liberation and the black liberation movement in the US.
- Islamic State militants stated that they will use social media to encourage Islamic extremism in Ferguson.
- On August 18, Secretary-General of the United Nations Ban Ki-moon called for U.S. authorities to ensure protection of the protesters' rights to peaceful assembly and freedom of expression. Through a spokesman, Ban called for "all to exercise restraint, for law enforcement officials to abide by U.S. and international standards in dealing with demonstrators."
- Protesters in Egypt expressed support for protesters in Ferguson using social media, and offered advice on how to deal with tear gas.
- Germany – In an interview with Der Spiegel, Marcel Kuhlmey, security expert and professor in the department of security management at the Berlin School of Economics and Law, asserted that what happened in Ferguson could never happen in Germany, stating that "In the U.S., it seems to me, the police are far quicker to resort to guns. Even at the training stage, there is a much heavier emphasis on shooting [than in Germany]." Zeit Online described the incident as an example of deep-rooted racism in the U.S., concluding that "the situation of African-Americans has barely improved since Martin Luther King."
- Azteca News wrote that Obama's "words of peace and reconciliation are perceived by many activists as inadequate and almost treason to a situation they see as a direct result of slavery and racial segregation laws that were in force until 1965."
- Abigail Chandler of the newspaper The Metro wrote that "[w]hile the London riots were at their worst, people were calling for rubber bullets, tear gas and water cannons to be used against the rioters, Ferguson is a living example of why we should be immensely grateful that those tactics were never used during the U.K. riots."
- On November 25, 2014, journalist Darlena Cunha had a Time magazine article published about the 2014 Ferguson unrest entitled "Ferguson: In Defense of Rioting." Cunha wrote that riots are "a necessary part of the evolution of society."
- On November 26, 2014, Stand Up To Racism and the London Black Revolutionaries organized a protest outside the Embassy of the United States, London against the grand jury's decision, gathering hundreds of people throughout the night.
- In 2020, Vicky Osterweil wrote In Defense of Looting as an apologia for looting, as occurred in Ferguson, as a way to redistribute wealth under racial capitalism

== Gallery ==
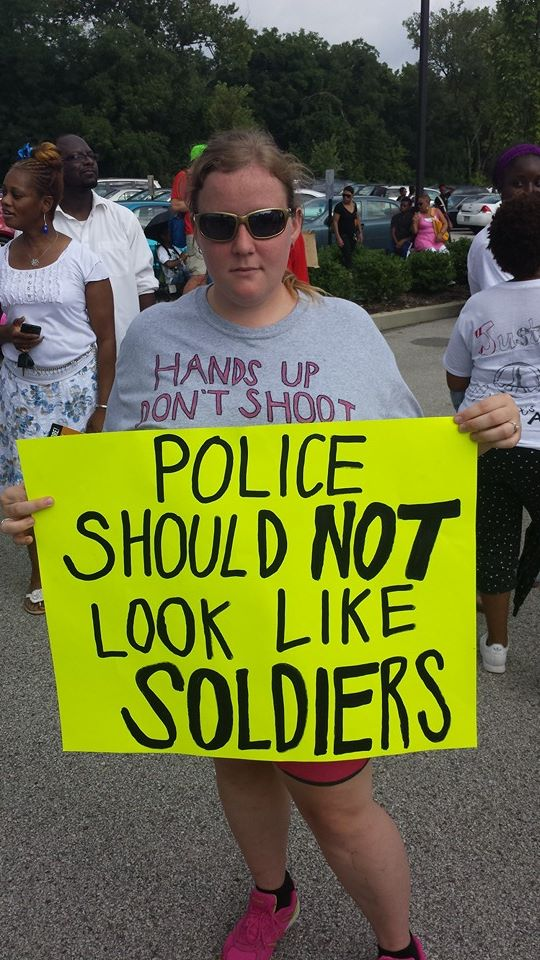
A woman protesting against the militarization of police

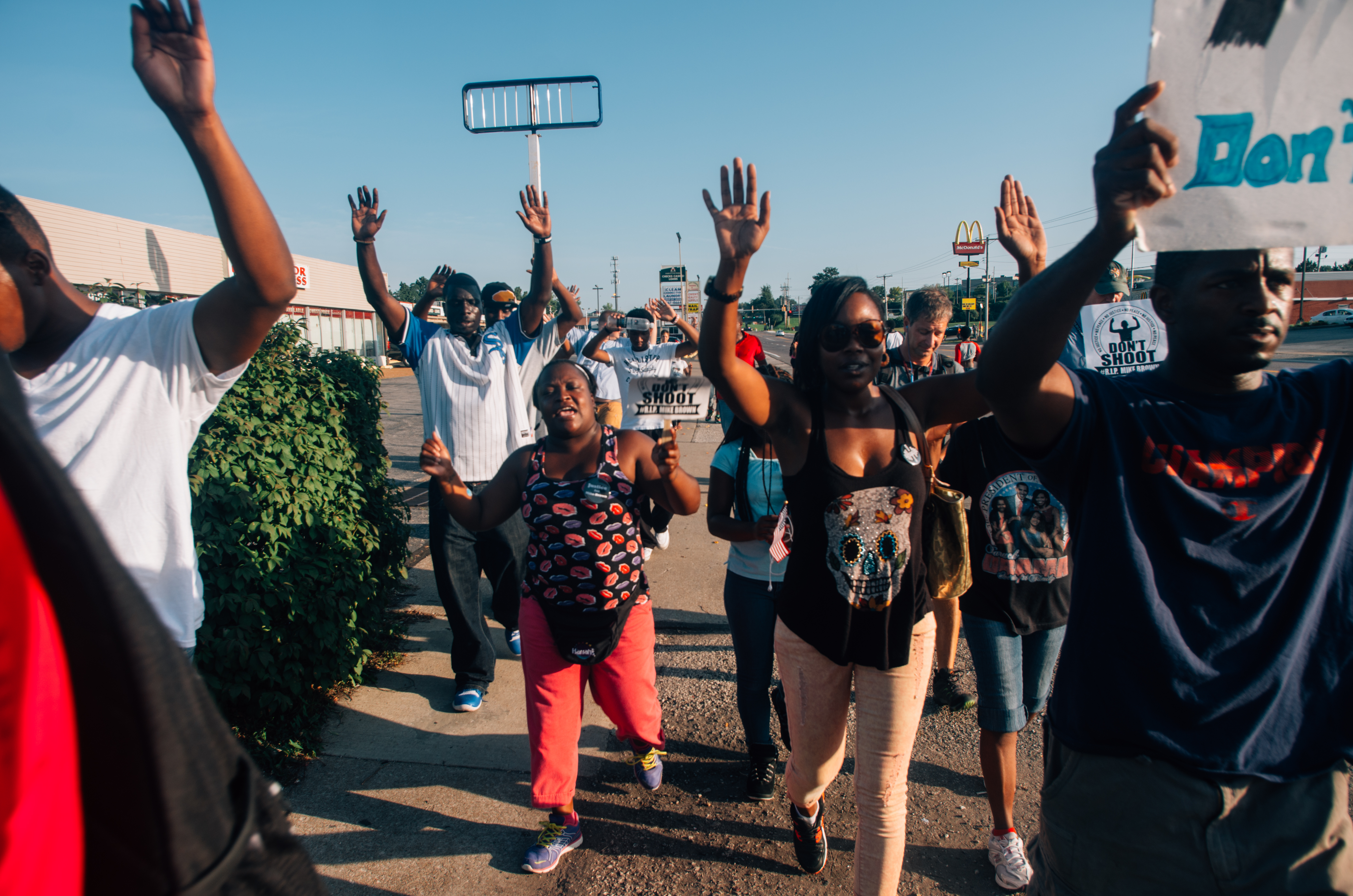
Protesters in Ferguson

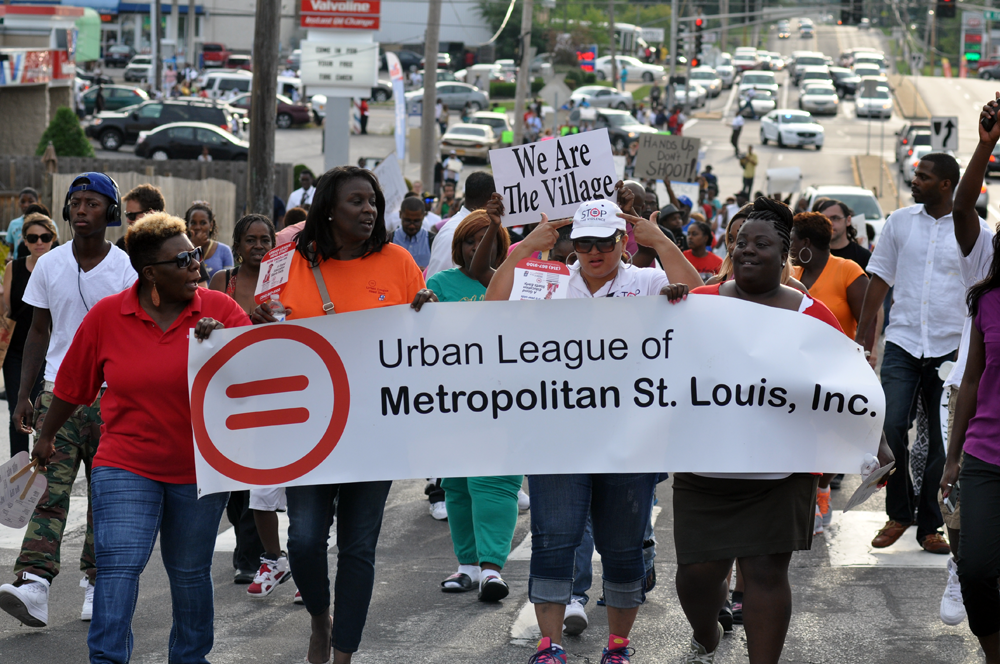
People marching in Ferguson, Missouri

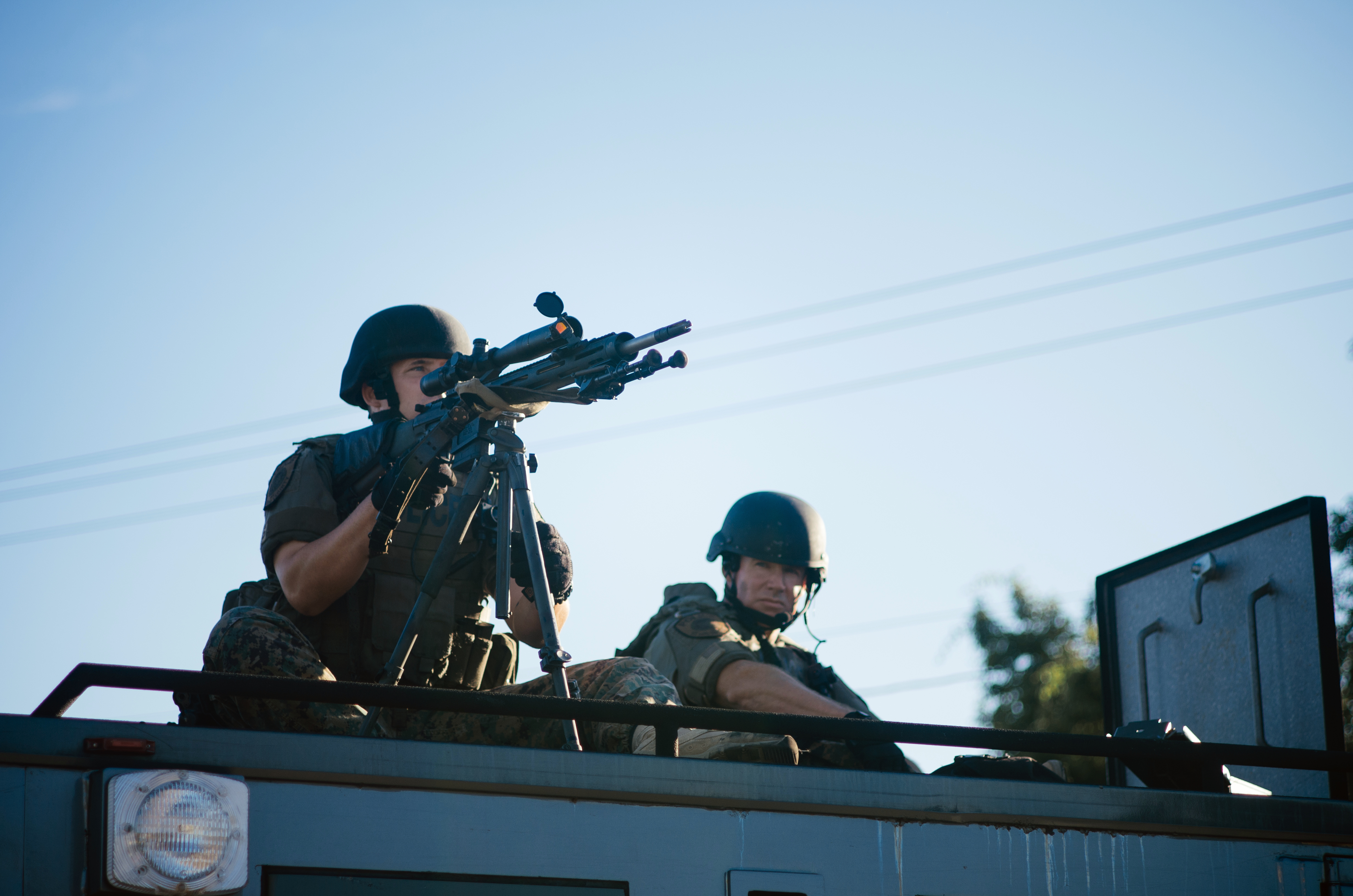
Sharpshooter, with weapon trained, atop a SWAT vehicle

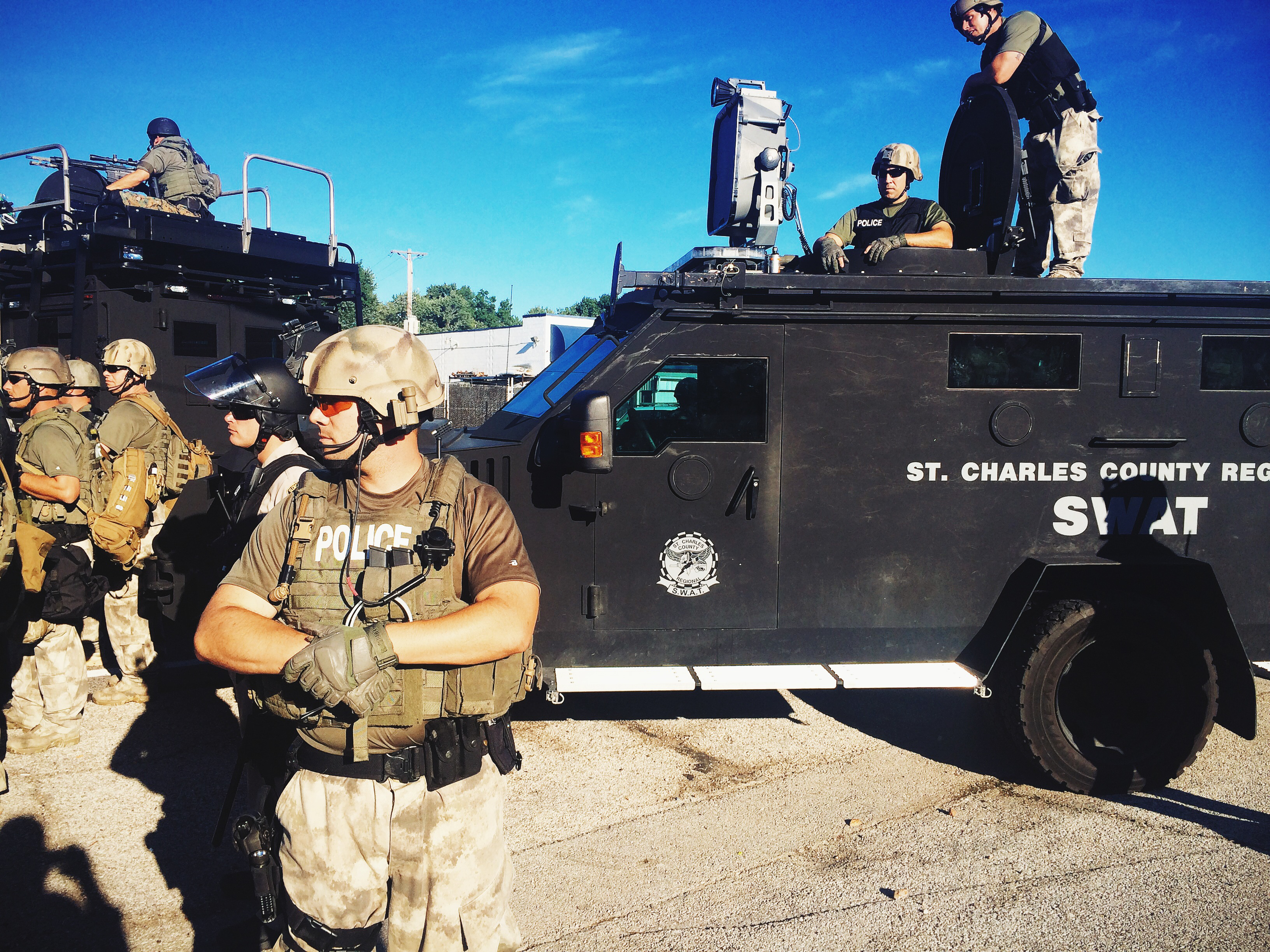
St. Charles County SWAT team at Ferguson. The device on top of the armored vehicle is a type of directed-energy weapon called an LRAD

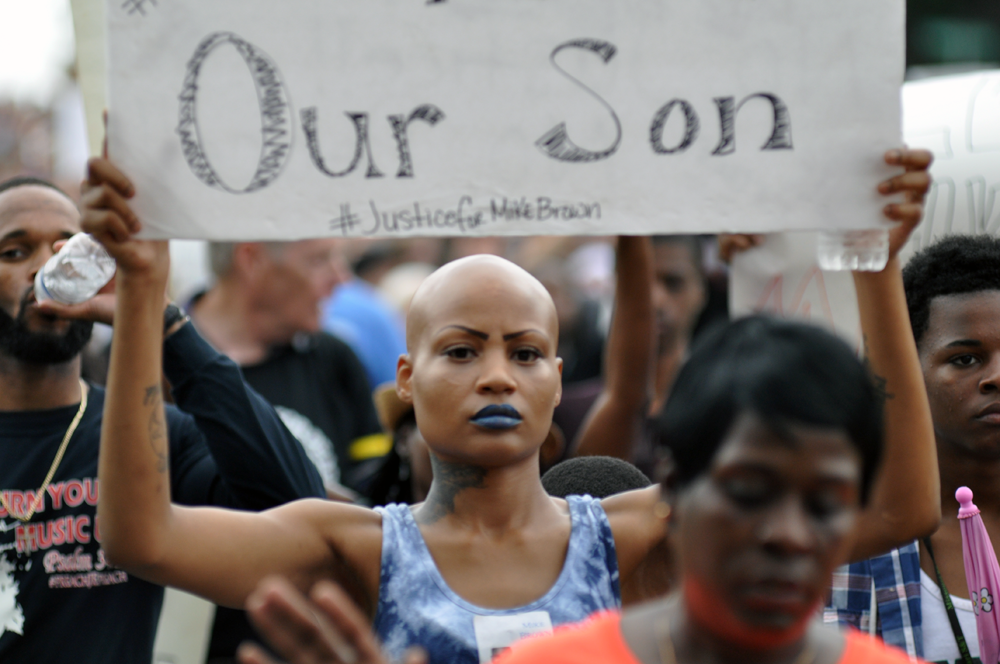
A woman holding a sign in Ferguson

== See also ==
- Ferguson effect
- List of incidents of civil unrest in the United States
- Police brutality in the United States
- Race in the United States criminal justice system
- Racial profiling
