= Ken Waller (politician) =

American politician (1961–2025)

Member of the Missouri House of Representatives from the 114th district
- In office January 4, 2023 – August 24, 2025
- Preceded by: Becky Ruth
- Succeeded by: Ann Moloney

Personal details
- Born: October 26, 1961 Festus, Missouri, U.S.
- Died: August 24, 2025 (aged 63) Herculaneum, Missouri, U.S.
- Party: Republican
- Education: University of Missouri–St. Louis

Kenneth Brian Waller (October 26, 1961 – August 24, 2025) was an American politician who served as a Republican member of the Missouri House of Representatives, representing the state's 114th House district.

== Life and career ==
Waller was born in Festus, Missouri, on October 26, 1961. He successfully ran for Jefferson County treasurer in 2004. He was elected county clerk in 2018.

In the 2022 Missouri House of Representatives election, Waller was elected in District 114. He was elected to a second term in the 2024 election.

Waller died at his home in Herculaneum, Missouri on August 24, 2025, at the age of 63. He was succeeded in his district by Republican Ann Moloney.
