= List of United States tornadoes from May to June 2026 =

United States tornadoes from May to June 2026
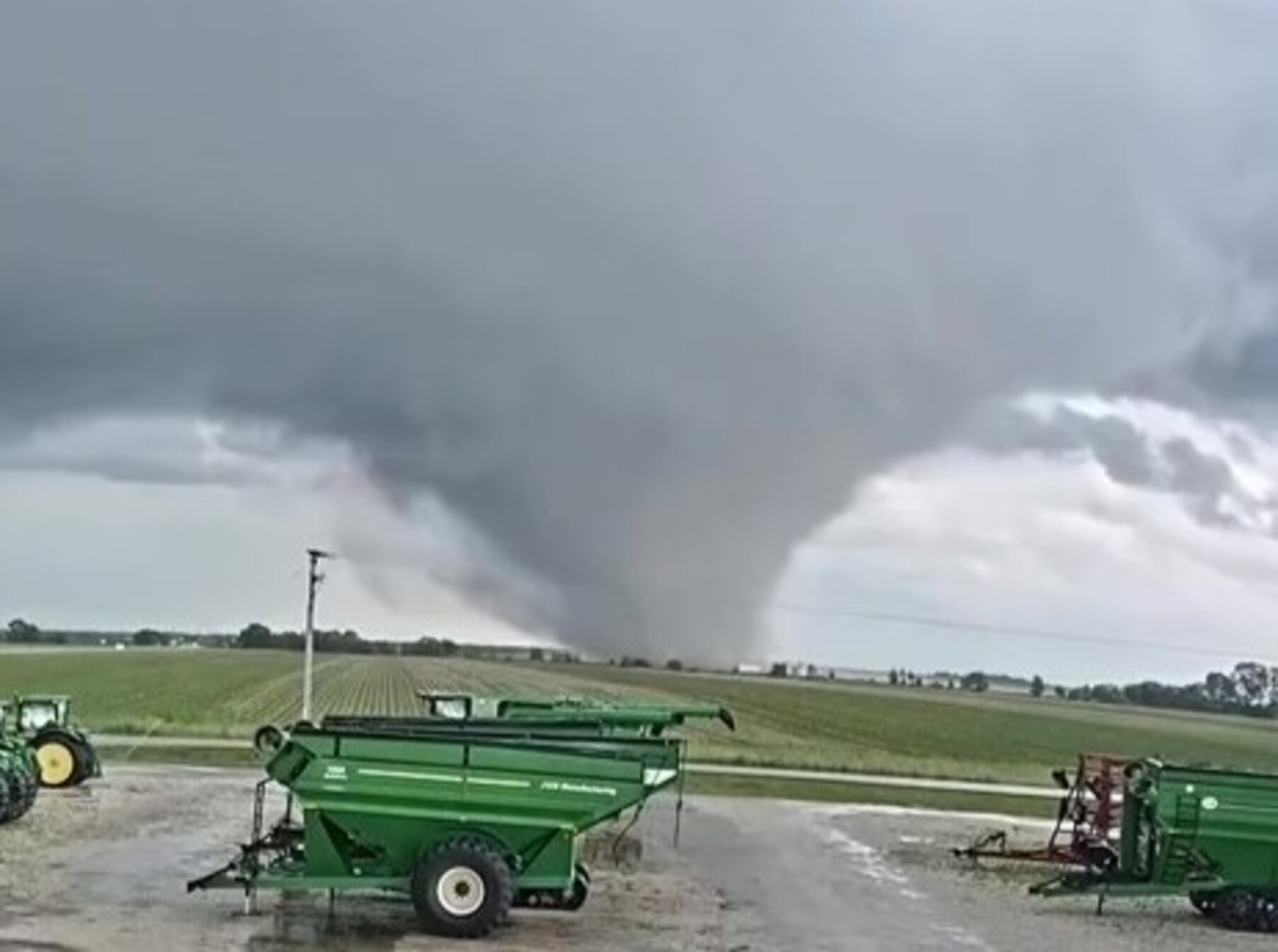
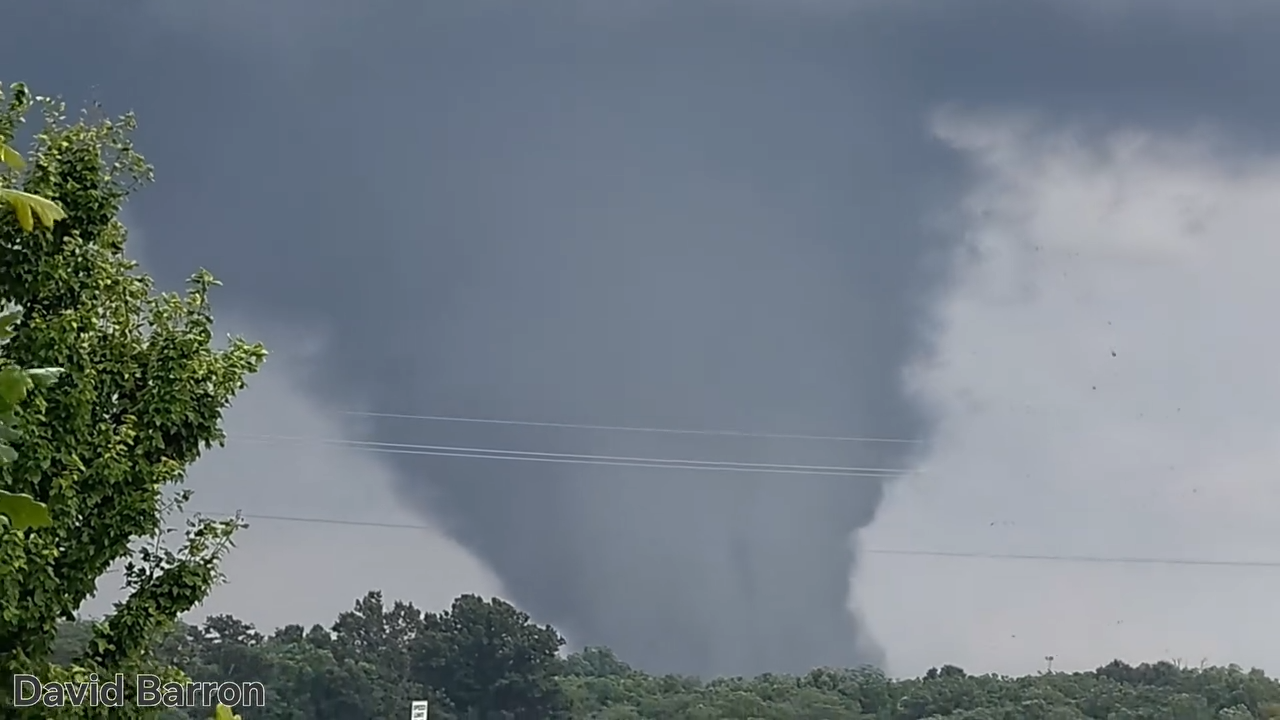
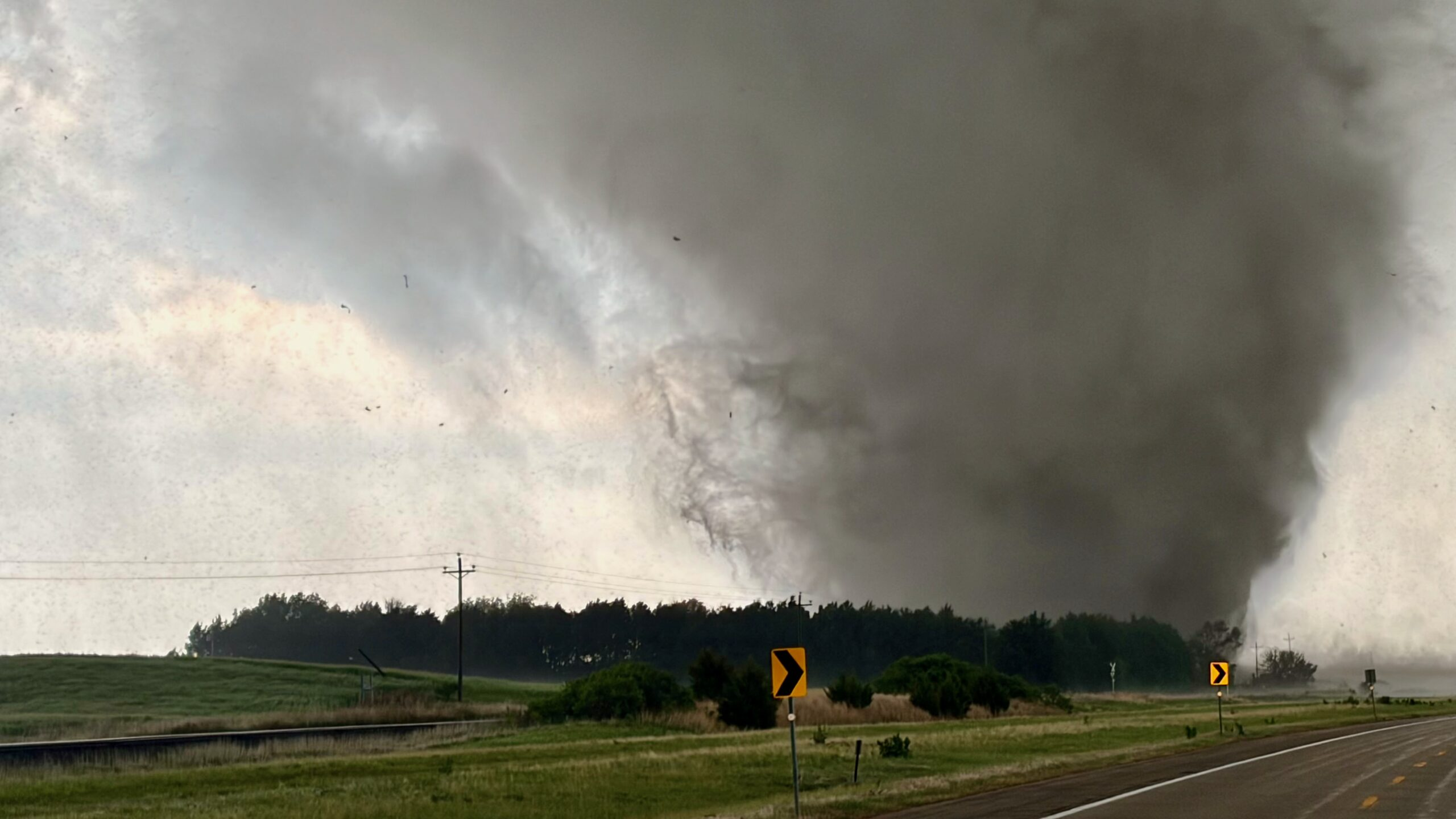
- Clockwise from top: An EF3 tornado near Streator, Illinois on June 11; an EF3 tornado near St. Libory, Nebraska on May 17; an EF3 tornado near Dix, Illinois on June 21
- Timespan: May 1 – June 30
- Maximum rated tornado: EF3 tornado: List; Garden City–Thayer, Mississippi on May 6; St. Libory, Nebraska on May 17; Washburn, Illinois on June 11; Streator, Illinois on June 11; Kouts, Indiana on June 11; Effingham, Illinois on June 17; Hindustan, Indiana on June 17; Dix, Illinois on June 21
- Tornadoes: 509
- Fatalities: 3
- Injuries: 59

This page documents all tornadoes confirmed by various weather forecast offices of the National Weather Service in the United States from May through June 2026. Tornado counts are considered preliminary until final publication in the database of the National Centers for Environmental Information. Based on the 1991–2020 average, about 265 tornadoes occur in the United States in May, and 212 tornadoes occur in June. Activity spreads northward and westward in May, with the maxima moving into the Midwest and the Great Plains as the springtime jet stream patterns tend to occur farther north. Tornado activity slowly begins to dwindle in the Southeast while the potential for activity also increases in the Northeast.

Unlike previous years, May was well below average, with only 158 tornadoes being confirmed during the month. Additionally, only three tornadoes were rated as strong (EF2+), with only two being rated intense (EF3+) throughout the month. One of the main factors for this was the ongoing transition from La Niña to El Niño, which suppressed severe weather due to a weaker subtropical jet stream and little wind energy in the upper atmosphere to help thunderstorms rotate, while the northern branch of the jet stream remained in Canada. This coupled with persistent "troughing" in the eastern United States and severe drought conditions across the High Plains led to cool dry air spreading across the central United States for much of the month, limiting the available energy needed to generate large tornado outbreaks.

Similarly to the year prior, and in a significant reversal from May, June was very active with a significantly above-average total of 351 tornadoes confirmed in the month, making it the third most active June ever recorded, behind only 1992 and 1998. Many of these tornadoes were concentrated in the Midwest, with three large outbreaks in Illinois and Indiana in particular on June 11, 17, and 21, respectively. Tropical Storm Arthur also generated an outbreak in the Southeastern States on June 18–19. Sporadic activity occurred throughout the rest of the month elsewhere in the United States.

== May ==
Confirmed tornadoes by Enhanced Fujita rating
EFU	EF0	EF1	EF2	EF3	EF4	EF5	Total
70	40	45	1	2	0	0	158

=== May 1 event ===
List of confirmed tornadoes – Friday, May 1, 2026 (Note: All dates are based on the local time zone where the tornado touched down; however, all times are in Coordinated Universal Time for consistency.)
EF#	Location	County / Parish	State	Start Coord.	Time (UTC)	Path length	Max width
EF1	SE of Victoria	Victoria	TX	28.7366°N 96.9158°W	19:02–19:06	1.1 mi (1.8 km)	400 yd (370 m)
EF1	This high-end EF1 tornado scoured farmland before moving into a residential area, where several manufactured homes sustained significant damage including roof loss and broken windows. One manufactured home was completely destroyed. The tornado dissipated shortly after impacting the residential area.						

=== May 6 event ===
List of confirmed tornadoes – Wednesday, May 6, 2026
EF#	Location	County / Parish	State	Start Coord.	Time (UTC)	Path length	Max width
EF0	E of Monterey	Concordia	LA	31.4499°N 91.6008°W	22:03–22:06	1.2 mi (1.9 km)	50 yd (46 m)
EF0	A brief tornado was observed by a storm chaser, downing multiple trees.						
EF1	SE of Progress to SSW of Tylertown	Pike, Walthall	MS	31.0194°N 90.2911°W	22:45–22:58	7.44 mi (11.97 km)	175 yd (160 m)
EF1	A tornado snapped or uprooted numerous trees and downed wooden transmission poles.						
EF3	SSW of Sibley to SSW of Monticello	Adams, Wilkinson, Franklin, Lincoln, Lawrence	MS	31.34°N 91.44°W	23:22–01:31	81.9 mi (131.8 km)	2,640 yd (2,410 m)
EF3	This very large, extremely long-tracked, high-end EF3 tornado caused widespread damage, snapped and debarked trees, collapsed a transmission tower and bent another to the ground, and heavily damaged or destroyed numerous homes, mobile homes, and vehicles. 23 people were injured.						
EF2	N of Baxterville to northern Purvis	Lamar	MS	31.1171°N 89.591°W	23:51–00:13	13.44 mi (21.63 km)	600 yd (550 m)
EF2	This strong, high-end EF2 tornado touched down and tracked through heavily wooded areas, damaging numerous trees. As it approached Purvis, it damaged or destroyed outbuildings, blew trees onto homes, and tossed a mobile home from its blocks as it tracked east-northeast. The tornado then intensified significantly near MS 589, where multiple residences lost roofs and suffered exterior wall failure, while several warehouse and commercial buildings sustained severe structural damage including collapsed walls, destroyed support columns, and major roof loss. Additional widespread damage to trees, roofs, and outbuildings occurred as the tornado continued east before weakening and eventually dissipating after crossing US 11. Four people were injured.						
EF1	Northern Beaumont	Perry	MS	31.1663°N 89.0803°W	00:37–00:55	11.97 mi (19.26 km)	700 yd (640 m)
EF1	A multi-vortex, high-end EF1 tornado tracked for a considerable distance through northern portions of the De Soto National Forest, where it snapped and uprooted numerous hardwood and softwood trees. It crossed MS 29 and later US 98, where some of the most significant damage occurred, with multiple areas of severe tree destruction. The tornado continued eastward, repeatedly strengthening and weakening while causing widespread forest damage, including around Horseshoe Bend Lake and near the Leaf River, where the tornado finally dissipated.						
EF1	NW of Leakesville	Greene	MS	31.2095°N 88.6632°W	01:16–01:25	4.39 mi (7.07 km)	120 yd (110 m)
EF1	A tornado began southwest of MS 63 and moved northeast, producing intermittent tree damage through forested areas before crossing the highway and continuing to damage trees. It intensified as it approached more open terrain, reaching peak strength when it caused a concentrated swath of more substantial treefall. After this peak, the damage became increasingly sporadic before the tornado weakened and lifted.						
EF0	S of Prentiss	Jefferson Davis	MS	31.5755°N 89.888°W	01:54–02:00	3.66 mi (5.89 km)	200 yd (180 m)
EF0	Several small trees and tree limbs were downed.						
EF1	NNE of Bassfield	Covington	MS	31.6015°N 89.7073°W	02:10–02:14	1.99 mi (3.20 km)	300 yd (270 m)
EF1	This tornado blew the roof off of a shed and uprooted several large trees.						
EF1	NNE of Topisaw to SW of Morgantown	Walthall, Marion	MS	31.3193°N 90.2568°W	03:42–04:06	16.63 mi (26.76 km)	150 yd (140 m)
EF1	A tornado touched down and initially produced a narrow path of tree damage before strengthening near MS 44, where it uprooted trees, removed metal roofing from a porch, and snapped numerous tree trunks. As it moved east, it crossed MS 583, damaging a church roof and causing additional tree damage, then continued through wooded areas where pockets of more significant tree destruction were observed. The tornado weakened and strengthened intermittently along its track, producing mainly uprooted trees, snapped trunks, and large downed branches as it crossed MS 27 and continued into Marion County, causing further damage to trees before dissipating.						

=== May 7 event ===
List of confirmed tornadoes – Thursday, May 7, 2026
EF#	Location	County / Parish	State	Start Coord.	Time (UTC)	Path length	Max width
EF1	N of Grand Bay to NW of Irvington	Mobile	AL	30.5376°N 88.3184°W	14:02–14:09	4.63 mi (7.45 km)	150 yd (140 m)
EF1	A tornado snapped several trees and tree limbs. A horse trailer was also flipped.						
EF0	N of Belle Fontaine	Mobile	AL	30.5232°N 88.1337°W	14:16–14:19	1.68 mi (2.70 km)	30 yd (27 m)
EF0	A weak tornado caused minor tree damage in the southern portions of an industrial park.						

=== May 9 event ===
List of confirmed tornadoes – Saturday, May 9, 2026
EF#	Location	County / Parish	State	Start Coord.	Time (UTC)	Path length	Max width
EF0	N of Ten Sleep	Washakie	WY	44.1002°N 107.4662°W	18:11–18:13	0.5 mi (0.80 km)	20 yd (18 m)
EF0	A landspout was filmed as it remained over open country.						
EF1	Delco to Acme	Columbus	NC	34.3177°N 78.2174°W	19:23–19:26	1.38 mi (2.22 km)	100 yd (91 m)
EF1	This tornado touched down in Delco, snapping several trees and downing powerlines. It tracked east where it impacted a store; tore and destroyed a metal awning; and damaged a nearby 500-gallon propane tank, causing it to leak. The tornado then crossed NC 87 causing intermittent damage before inflicting more damage to the roofs of three structures before dissipating. The tornado was produced by a mini supercell that did not produce any lightning. No severe warnings were ever issued for this storm.						

=== May 10 event ===
List of confirmed tornadoes – Sunday, May 10, 2026
EF#	Location	County / Parish	State	Start Coord.	Time (UTC)	Path length	Max width
EFU	SE of Colorado City	Mitchell	TX	32.21°N 100.78°W	20:11–20:14	Unknown	Unknown
EFU	A storm chaser reported a landspout.						

=== May 11 event ===
List of confirmed tornadoes – Monday, May 11, 2026
EF#	Location	County / Parish	State	Start Coord.	Time (UTC)	Path length	Max width
EF0	NW of Paulina	St. James	LA	30.03°N 90.74°W	01:10–01:11	0.69 mi (1.11 km)	10 yd (9.1 m)
EF0	A brief, weak tornado caused minor uplift to the shingles of two homes.						

=== May 12 event ===
List of confirmed tornadoes – Tuesday, May 12, 2026
EF#	Location	County / Parish	State	Start Coord.	Time (UTC)	Path length	Max width
EF0	Hudson	Pasco	FL	28.3493°N 82.7068°W	18:14–18:19	1.18 mi (1.90 km)	400 yd (370 m)
EF0	This slow-moving tornado snapped a tree branch that fell on a power line, inflicted partial roof damage or loss to two homes, damaged the roof, lanai, or carport of other homes, and damaged trees.						
EF0	W of Shady Hills	Pasco	FL	28.4008°N 82.6078°W	18:43–18:48	0.67 mi (1.08 km)	250 yd (230 m)
EF0	A high-end EF0 tornado uprooted a large tree that fell on a mobile home and snapped tree limbs and branches.						

=== May 13 event ===
List of confirmed tornadoes – Wednesday, May 13, 2026
EF#	Location	County / Parish	State	Start Coord.	Time (UTC)	Path length	Max width
EF0	E of Reedsville	Preston	WV	39.5035°N 79.7545°W	20:32–20:35	0.8 mi (1.3 km)	65 yd (59 m)
EF0	This tornado formed west of WV 7, and then crossed it as it moved east-northeastward, uprooting trees, snapping dead trees, and scattering large branches. After causing sporadic tree damage in a wooded area, the tornado was recorded by security cameras as it struck the Hovatter's Wildlife Zoo. It snapped and uprooted more trees, and scattered additional large tree branches before dissipating on the east side of the zoo.						
EFU	WNW of Big Sandy	Chouteau	MT	48.2354°N 110.3206°W	22:00	Unknown	Unknown
EFU	A dust-wrapped landspout was recorded. No damage occurred.						

=== May 16 event ===
List of confirmed tornadoes – Saturday, May 16, 2026
EF#	Location	County / Parish	State	Start Coord.	Time (UTC)	Path length	Max width
EF0	S of Benton to SSW of Shullsburg	Lafayette	WI	42.5457°N 90.3307°W	05:11–05:14	4.76 mi (7.66 km)	50 yd (46 m)
EF0	This tornado touched down along a county road causing tree damage, snapping one at the trunk which was rotted. As it tracked east it damaged metal farm buildings, lofting sheet metal into a nearby forest.						
EFU	NW of Hawk Springs (1st tornado)	Goshen	WY	41.83°N 104.3°W	22:44–22:59	0.6 mi (0.97 km)	15 yd (14 m)
EFU	First of two landspouts that occurred at the same time. No damage was reported.						
EFU	NW of Hawk Springs (2nd tornado)	Goshen	WY	41.84°N 104.31°W	22:47–22:51	0.2 mi (0.32 km)	10 yd (9.1 m)
EFU	Second of two landspouts that occurred at the same time. No damage was reported.						
EFU	SW of Gravity	Taylor	IA	40.7295°N 94.7897°W	22:51–22:57	0.8 mi (1.3 km)	20 yd (18 m)
EFU	An intermittent tornado remained over open land.						
EF0	SW of Shafter	Linn	MO	39.9596°N 93.3065°W	23:22–23:25	1.42 mi (2.29 km)	100 yd (91 m)
EF0	This high-end EF0 tornado initially damaged the roof of an outbuilding before moving east-northeastward through a wooded area. It then impacted a farm, removing flashing and siding from a home, and removing a significant portion of metal roofing from a barn and scattering the debris downwind. East of the farm, the tornado damaged trees, including one that was uprooted, before dissipating shortly thereafter.						
EF1	NE of Shafter	Linn	MO	40.0016°N 93.2895°W	23:28–23:32	2.58 mi (4.15 km)	200 yd (180 m)
EF1	Shortly after the previous tornado dissipated, the same storm spawned this high-end EF1 tornado that initially damaged trees, as it moved southeastward. The tornado then struck a farm, destroying two outbuildings, removing the roofs of other outbuildings, tossing two empty grain bins, and causing minor roof and siding damage to a home. Continuing southeastward, the tornado continued to snap and uproot trees before turning almost due eastward along Route DD, snapping power poles, along with snapping and uprooting more trees before dissipating.						
EFU	WSW of Edson	Sherman	KS	39.332°N 101.568°W	23:40–23:41	0.01 mi (0.016 km)	25 yd (23 m)
EFU	A brief tornado occurred in a field.						
EF0	E of Chula	Livingston	MO	39.922°N 93.4334°W	23:43–23:44	0.2 mi (0.32 km)	50 yd (46 m)
EF0	This brief, weak tornado moved east-northeastward across Route K, snapping tree branches and removing the west-facing roof from a wood-framed metal outbuilding.						

=== May 17 event ===
List of confirmed tornadoes – Sunday, May 17, 2026
EF#	Location	County / Parish	State	Start Coord.	Time (UTC)	Path length	Max width
EF0	Villas	Lee	FL	26.5574°N 81.871°W	20:17–20:18	0.11 mi (0.18 km)	25 yd (23 m)
EF0	A landspout was recorded lofting dust and small debris.						
EF0	Whiskey Creek	Lee	FL	26.5779°N 81.8878°W	20:25–20:31	2.07 mi (3.33 km)	150 yd (140 m)
EF0	This landspout produced a narrow path of damage through a residential area, snapping large tree branches, uprooting at least one large tree, and scattering lawn furniture and yard decorations while causing minor fence and roof damage. As it moved northwest, additional tree damage occurred before moved offshore onto the Caloosahatchee River where it dissipated.						
EF0	Cape Coral	Lee	FL	26.6003°N 81.9826°W	20:35–20:38	0.54 mi (0.87 km)	50 yd (46 m)
EF0	A landspout inflicted localized damage as it moved through a residential area, displacing a pickup truck, blowing around lawn furniture and other debris, and knocking over sections of vinyl fencing. Additional minor damage included impacts to fences and some roofs before it lifted.						
EFU	W of Davis	Turner	SD	43.2615°N 97.0387°W	21:05–21:06	0.65 mi (1.05 km)	20 yd (18 m)
EFU	A brief tornado was recorded in an open field.						
EFU	SSW of Dannebrog	Howard	NE	41.0535°N 98.5843°W	21:51		
EFU	A brief tornado was reported by local media. No damage was observed.						
EF3	N of St. Libory	Howard	NE	41.1288°N 98.4149°W	22:04–22:15	6.09 mi (9.80 km)	350 yd (320 m)
EF3	This intense, high-end EF3 tornado touched down northwest of St. Libory and quickly strengthened, destroying small outbuildings and damaging several trees within a farmstead. Power poles were snapped as the tornado crossed US 281. East of the highway, four houses were destroyed in a rural housing development, more power poles were snapped, and an irrigation pivot was overturned and broken into multiple pieces. East of the housing development, the tornado continued to snap hardwood trees as damage to fencing, power poles, and ground scouring continued to be observed. The tornado weakened as it continued east, causing less significant tree damage, before lifting just west of the Howard–Merrick county line. Observations and data was collected from this tornado by NOAA National Severe Storms Laboratory researchers during the LIFT Project.						
EF0	SE of Palmer to NW of Archer	Merrick	NE	41.2042°N 98.1724°W	22:23–22:25	1.34 mi (2.16 km)	30 yd (27 m)
EF0	A couple of irrigation pivots were overturned, an empty grain bin was damaged, and a few tree branches were broken.						
EFU	S of Ransom	Nobles	MN	43.5346°N 95.8036°W	22:58–23:00	1.25 mi (2.01 km)	30 yd (27 m)
EFU	A tornado occurred over open fields, causing no damage.						
EFU	N of Hoisington	Barton	KS	38.551°N 98.7716°W	23:05–23:06	0.08 mi (0.13 km)	20 yd (18 m)
EFU	A landspout was reported by an off-duty NWS employee.						
EFU	N of Org	Nobles	MN	43.5944°N 95.6504°W	23:15–23:16	0.61 mi (0.98 km)	20 yd (18 m)
EFU	A tornado was reported by a storm spotter. No damage was noted.						
EF1	S of Hebron	Thayer	NE	40.1391°N 97.6398°W	23:42–23:53	4.25 mi (6.84 km)	200 yd (180 m)
EF1	Minor tree damage took place near a creek as the tornado began southwest of town. As the tornado moved east-northeast towards Hebron, it strengthened and uprooted multiple trees. The roof of a golf cart shed was also removed at the Hebron Country Club. Moving over the city's airport, the tornado weakened as it damaged the roof of a farm shed and caused minor tree damage along its path. It lifted in the east-southeast portion of the city. This tornado prompted a tornado emergency for the city of Hebron.						
EF0	W of Ida Grove	Ida	IA	42.3406°N 95.5406°W	00:11–00:12	0.45 mi (0.72 km)	60 yd (55 m)
EF0	A brief tornado moved across a home and damaged multiple trees on the property.						
EFU	NW of Fairmont	Martin	MN	43.7074°N 94.492°W	00:12–00:13	0.29 mi (0.47 km)	25 yd (23 m)
EFU	A brief rope tornado formed along the highway, confirmed by law enforcement and storm chaser video.						
EF1	S of Winnebago	Thurston	NE	42.2172°N 96.4742°W	00:19–00:22	1.87 mi (3.01 km)	300 yd (270 m)
EF1	This tornado formed west of US 77 and moved northeast, causing damage to trees and the roofs of houses. On the southern edge of US 75, the tornado damaged bleachers, signs, and a dugout near baseball fields. Across the highway, grain bins were damaged, and a tree fell onto a house. Minor damage also occurred to a water tank and several trees as the tornado moved northeast before lifting just east of Winnebago.						
EF0	SE of Sergeant Bluff	Woodbury	IA	42.3638°N 96.3485°W	00:31–00:34	2.53 mi (4.07 km)	75 yd (69 m)
EF0	This tornado touched down near a rest area on I-29, traveling over open fields before downing large tree limbs.						
EF1	SE of Sioux City to NNW of Bronson	Woodbury	IA	42.4311°N 96.3087°W	00:37–00:42	3.85 mi (6.20 km)	100 yd (91 m)
EF1	A tornado damaged several trees and outbuildings along its path. The most severe damage was inflicted to a garage attached to a home.						
EFU	NW of Kingsley	Plymouth	IA	42.6237°N 96.0515°W	00:55–00:56	0.66 mi (1.06 km)	20 yd (18 m)
EFU	A brief tornado occurred.						
EF1	NNE of Ashland	Saunders	NE	41.0704°N 96.3554°W	00:55–00:58	0.76 mi (1.22 km)	40 yd (37 m)
EF1	This tornado touched down within an open field, snapping and tossing multiple large tree limbs. Moving northeast, a dock was thrown approximately 100 yd (91 m) at Sandy Pointe Lake, and a large portion of a home's roof was lifted and thrown 80 yd (73 m) into the lake. The tornado continued northeast and lifted just west of the Platte River.						
EFU	WNW of Fielding	Plymouth	IA	42.6802°N 95.8926°W	01:07–01:08	0.67 mi (1.08 km)	20 yd (18 m)
EFU	A tornado was observed by a storm spotter over fields. No damage occurred.						
EFU	NE of Fielding	Cherokee	IA	42.6857°N 95.7387°W	01:10–01:11	0.37 mi (0.60 km)	20 yd (18 m)
EFU	A tornado was reported. No damage was found.						
EFU	NNW of Fielding	Cherokee	IA	42.7394°N 95.828°W	01:11–01:13	0.92 mi (1.48 km)	20 yd (18 m)
EFU	No damage occurred as this tornado remained over open farmland.						
EFU	SSW of Meriden	Cherokee	IA	42.7529°N 95.6604°W	01:15–01:16	0.79 mi (1.27 km)	20 yd (18 m)
EFU	A tornado that caused no damage was documented by a storm spotter.						
EFU	NE of Meriden to SW of Larrabee	Cherokee	IA	42.8191°N 95.5959°W	01:25–01:27	0.87 mi (1.40 km)	20 yd (18 m)
EFU	A storm chaser reported a brief tornado in an open field. No damage is known to have occurred.						
EFU	SW of Royal	Clay	IA	43.0402°N 95.3797°W	01:31–01:33	1.19 mi (1.92 km)	20 yd (18 m)
EFU	This brief tornado was recorded and caused no damage.						
EFU	ESE of Truesdale to SW of Albert City	Buena Vista	IA	42.6885°N 95.0566°W	01:42–01:44	2.2 mi (3.5 km)	75 yd (69 m)
EFU	A tornado tracked through open fields causing no damage.						
EF1	Southern Plattsmouth	Cass	NE	40.9837°N 95.9050°W	01:45–01:47	0.83 mi (1.34 km)	100 yd (91 m)
EF1	Several trees were snapped, an empty grain bin was destroyed, and light damage occurred to some mobile homes.						
EFU	SE of Royal	Clay	IA	43.0328°N 95.2587°W	01:48–01:49	0.9 mi (1.4 km)	20 yd (18 m)
EFU	A brief tornado was reported. No damage was noted.						
EFU	NNE of Gillett Grove	Clay	IA	43.0296°N 95.0266°W	01:53–01:57	4 mi (6.4 km)	75 yd (69 m)
EFU	This tornado remained over open fields.						
EF1	S of Knoke to S of Pomeroy	Calhoun	IA	42.5098°N 94.7648°W	02:01–02:07	4.16 mi (6.69 km)	30 yd (27 m)
EF1	An EF1 tornado was confirmed by NWS Des Moines. Preliminary information.						
EF1	Plover	Pocahontas	IA	42.8684°N 94.6369°W	02:05–02:06	1.09 mi (1.75 km)	30 yd (27 m)
EF1	An EF1 tornado was confirmed by NWS Des Moines. Preliminary information.						
EF0	NNW of Ruthven	Clay	IA	43.1826°N 94.9299°W	02:06–02:08	1.21 mi (1.95 km)	30 yd (27 m)
EF0	This tornado damaged the roofs of two mobile homes and downed several large tree branches.						
EFU	NW of Terril	Dickinson	IA	43.3324°N 95.0072°W	02:08–02:09	0.61 mi (0.98 km)	20 yd (18 m)
EFU	A storm chaser observed a brief tornado in an open field.						
EF1	Mallard	Palo Alto	IA	42.921°N 94.7058°W	02:08–02:12	2.76 mi (4.44 km)	25 yd (23 m)
EF1	An EF1 tornado was confirmed by NWS Des Moines. Preliminary information.						
EF1	NE of Plover to S of Rodman	Palo Alto	IA	42.92°N 94.57°W	02:10–02:14	3.73 mi (6.00 km)	
EF1	An EF1 tornado was confirmed by NWS Des Moines. Preliminary information.						
EFU	ESE of Terril	Dickinson, Emmet	IA	43.2769°N 94.9374°W	02:10–02:14	2.83 mi (4.55 km)	45 yd (41 m)
EFU	This tornado remained over rural land and caused no damage.						
EF1	Rockwell City	Calhoun	IA	42.3953°N 94.6301°W	02:10	0.18 mi (0.29 km)	30 yd (27 m)
EF1	An EF1 tornado was confirmed by NWS Des Moines. Preliminary information.						
EF0	Southern Emmetsburg	Palo Alto	IA	43.0941°N 94.686°W	02:12–02:14	0.79 mi (1.27 km)	25 yd (23 m)
EF0	An EF0 tornado was confirmed by NWS Des Moines. Preliminary information.						
EF0	Eastern Graettinger	Palo Alto	IA	43.2274°N 94.7494°W	02:13–02:14	1.06 mi (1.71 km)	20 yd (18 m)
EF0	An EF0 tornado was confirmed by NWS Des Moines. Preliminary information.						
EF0	Western Whittemore	Palo Alto, Kossuth	IA	43.0681°N 94.4241°W	02:17–02:18	1.61 mi (2.59 km)	25 yd (23 m)
EF0	An EF0 tornado was confirmed by NWS Des Moines. Preliminary information.						
EF1	Lone Rock	Kossuth	IA	43.2114°N 94.3315°W	02:29–02:30	0.74 mi (1.19 km)	30 yd (27 m)
EF1	An EF1 tornado was confirmed by NWS Des Moines. Preliminary information.						
EF0	Moorland	Webster	IA	42.4348°N 94.3454°W	02:29–02:33	4.68 mi (7.53 km)	50 yd (46 m)
EF0	An EF0 tornado was confirmed by NWS Des Moines. Preliminary information.						
EF1	NW of Gruver	Emmet	IA	43.4°N 94.73°W	02:29	1.07 mi (1.72 km)	25 yd (23 m)
EF1	An EF1 tornado was confirmed by NWS Des Moines. Preliminary information.						
EF1	N of Wesley to WNW of Crystal Lake	Kossuth, Hancock	IA	43.1427°N 93.9901°W	02:44–02:51	10.2 mi (16.4 km)	25 yd (23 m)
EF1	An EF1 tornado was confirmed by NWS Des Moines. Preliminary information.						
EF1	Eastern Ventura	Cerro Gordo	IA	43.1259°N 93.4621°W	03:07–03:08	0.24 mi (0.39 km)	25 yd (23 m)
EF1	An EF1 tornado was confirmed by NWS Des Moines. Preliminary information.						
EF1	S of Joice to SW of Northwood	Worth	IA	43.3441°N 93.4595°W	03:10–03:21	9.25 mi (14.89 km)	25 yd (23 m)
EF1	An EF1 tornado was confirmed by NWS Des Moines. Preliminary information.						
EF1	SW of Conger	Freeborn	MN	43.5843°N 93.5724°W	03:14–03:20	1.07 mi (1.72 km)	50 yd (46 m)
EF1	This tornado damaged siding and vinyl on a few houses, moderately damaged a few small outbuildings and snapped a few trees.						
EFU	NE of Clear Lake	Cerro Gordo	IA	43.17°N 93.34°W	03:15–03:18	2.35 mi (3.78 km)	
EFU	An EFU tornado was confirmed by NWS Des Moines. Preliminary information.						
EFU	ESE of Burchinal to S of Mason City	Cerro Gordo	IA	43.06°N 93.26°W	03:18–03:21	2.56 mi (4.12 km)	
EFU	An EFU tornado was confirmed by NWS Des Moines. Preliminary information.						
EF1	Southern Plymouth	Cerro Gordo, Worth	IA	43.232°N 93.1663°W	03:23–03:29	6.97 mi (11.22 km)	40 yd (37 m)
EF1	An EF1 tornado was confirmed by NWS Des Moines. Preliminary information.						
EF1	SE of Glenville	Freeborn	MN	43.5369°N 93.2508°W	03:27–03:32	0.37 mi (0.60 km)	50 yd (46 m)
EF1	This tornado caused damage to multiple outbuildings and uprooted trees and downed branches.						

=== May 18 event ===
List of confirmed tornadoes – Monday, May 18, 2026
EF#	Location	County / Parish	State	Start Coord.	Time (UTC)	Path length	Max width
EF0	NW of Ludlow	Ford	IL	40.415°N 88.1911°W	15:25–15:26	1.03 mi (1.66 km)	80 yd (73 m)
EF0	Minor damage occurred to a farmstead.						
EF0	SSW of Waters	Otsego	MI	44.8639°N 84.7089°W	18:33–18:34	0.1 mi (0.16 km)	20 yd (18 m)
EF0	A waterspout briefly touched down on Big Bradford Lake, causing damage to tree branches and standing objects as it moved ashore.						
EFU	S of Diller	Jefferson	NE	40.0427°N 96.9323°W	19:46–19:47	0.25 mi (0.40 km)	15 yd (14 m)
EFU	A storm chaser captured a tornado crossing N-8. No damage occurred.						
EFU	NW of Odell	Gage	NE	40.0899°N 96.8392°W	19:57–19:58	0.6 mi (0.97 km)	20 yd (18 m)
EFU	Local fire department officials and a storm spotter reported a tornado. Damage was noted but was inconclusive if it was a result of this tornado or leftover from a damaging wind event two days prior. Due to the uncertainty, the tornado is rated EFU.						
EFU	N of Miltonvale	Cloud	KS	39.3965°N 97.4466°W	20:27–20:28	1.27 mi (2.04 km)	30 yd (27 m)
EFU	A rope tornado was recorded over open fields.						
EFU	SE of Palmer	Washington	KS	39.5941°N 97.1242°W	21:03–21:07	2.54 mi (4.09 km)	50 yd (46 m)
EFU	This tornado was documented as it remained over fields, causing no damage.						
EF1	NNE of Elk Creek to SSW of Johnson	Johnson, Nemaha	NE	40.335°N 96.0961°W	21:05–21:11	3.7 mi (6.0 km)	200 yd (180 m)
EF1	This tornado touched down over open fields, destroying at least two farm sheds, damaging trees, and flipping pivots.						
EF1	W of Auburn	Nemaha	NE	40.3881°N 95.904°W	21:20–21:22	1.88 mi (3.03 km)	80 yd (73 m)
EF1	A tornado developed south of US 136 and moved east-northeast, causing sporadic tree damage and uprooting trees as it impacted two farmsteads. At one farm, a large trailer was rolled about 50 yd (46 m) while several trees were snapped or uprooted and fell onto a home. At another farm, a large shed was destroyed and its debris was strewn downstream. The tornado lifted shortly after.						
EF0	S of Julian	Nemaha	NE	40.4658°N 95.8561°W	21:27–21:30	0.6 mi (0.97 km)	20 yd (18 m)
EF0	Several large tree branches were downed.						
EFU	NE of Summerfield, KS	Pawnee	NE	40.0505°N 96.2716°W	21:34–21:35	0.64 mi (1.03 km)	50 yd (46 m)
EFU	A tornado was reported by an emergency manager.						
EF1	E of Bern, KS to SW of Salem, NE	Nemaha (KS), Richardson (NE)	KS, NE	39.9562°N 95.8919°W	21:46–21:59	6.96 mi (11.20 km)	200 yd (180 m)
EF1	A tornado touched down and moved northeast, significantly damaging an old barn and destroying another small barn. It then crossed state lines into Nebraska, where it inflicted significant roof damage to a large metal outbuilding and caused additional damage to another metal outbuilding. Numerous trees were damaged along the path before the tornado dissipated.						
EF1	NE of Salem to N of Falls City	Richardson	NE	40.0901°N 95.7084°W	22:07–22:15	6.46 mi (10.40 km)	250 yd (230 m)
EF1	This high-end EF1 tornado developed northeast of Salem and moved northeast, causing intermittent damage to trees and farm outbuildings before breaking power poles and damaging additional trees along its path. After crossing US 73, it removed the roof from a farm outbuilding and continued to produce scattered tree and structural damage before weakening and dissipating shortly afterward.						
EF1	E of Blue Rapids to NNE of Frankfort	Marshall	KS	39.6849°N 96.6299°W	22:27–23:02	12.23 mi (19.68 km)	100 yd (91 m)
EF1	A tornado sporadically snapped large tree limbs and trees. A couple of grain bins were also destroyed.						
EFU	N of Wakefield	Clay	KS	39.2294°N 97.028°W	22:33–22:35	1.75 mi (2.82 km)	30 yd (27 m)
EFU	This tornado was recorded moving along the northern shores of Milford Lake. No damage occurred.						
EF0	ENE of Maloy to Benton to W of Mount Ayr	Ringgold	IA	40.6812°N 94.3955°W	23:54–00:01	6.06 mi (9.75 km)	30 yd (27 m)
EF0	An EF0 tornado was confirmed by NWS Des Moines. Preliminary information.						
EFU	WSW of Grant City	Worth	MO	40.46°N 94.48°W	00:13	0.26 mi (0.42 km)	
EFU	Several storm spotters observed a brief tornado that caused no damage.						
EF1	SSE of Circleville to NNE of Holton	Jackson	KS	39.4614°N 95.826°W	00:16–00:26	8.45 mi (13.60 km)	75 yd (69 m)
EF1	This tornado destroyed an outbuilding and a barn, broke large branches, and blew out porch windows.						
EF1	E of Council Grove to N of Allen	Morris, Lyon	KS	38.6503°N 96.4127°W	00:44–00:59	15.07 mi (24.25 km)	50 yd (46 m)
EF1	A tornado damaged several power poles and large branches. Roof material was lifted from a two-story home.						
EF0	Fillmore to SSE of Rankin	Andrew	MO	40.0208°N 94.9896°W	01:11–01:16	4.86 mi (7.82 km)	75 yd (69 m)
EF0	This high-end EF0 tornado moved through Fillmore, damaging several homes and outbuildings. The tornado exited Fillmore and caused damaged to trees before lifting.						
EF1	E of Miltondale to Swanwick to S of Millville	Ray	MO	39.2638°N 94.2004°W	02:47–03:06	16.98 mi (27.33 km)	100 yd (91 m)
EF1	An empty livestock trailer was overturned, an outbuilding was damaged, numerous trees were snapped or uprooted, and power poles were damaged.						

=== May 19 event ===
List of confirmed tornadoes – Tuesday, May 19, 2026
EF#	Location	County / Parish	State	Start Coord.	Time (UTC)	Path length	Max width
EFU	N of Barnhart	Irion	TX	31.3°N 101.15°W	21:19–21:21	0.31 mi (0.50 km)	20 yd (18 m)
EFU	A brief tornado was reported.						

=== May 21 event ===
List of confirmed tornadoes – Thursday, May 21, 2026
EF#	Location	County / Parish	State	Start Coord.	Time (UTC)	Path length	Max width
EFU	W of Pine Bluffs	Laramie	WY	41.18°N 104.13°W	22:04–22:09	0.1 mi (0.16 km)	10 yd (9.1 m)
EFU	A landspout was reported by local fire department officials.						
EFU	N of Pine Bluffs	Laramie	WY	41.24°N 104.08°W	22:06–22:09	1.5 mi (2.4 km)	150 yd (140 m)
EFU	A rather large, dusty landspout was highly documented as it caused no damage over open country.						
EFU	NNE of Oliver to NW of Kimball	Kimball	NE	41.31°N 103.75°W	22:48–22:55	3.2 mi (5.1 km)	100 yd (91 m)
EFU	A stovepipe tornado remained over open country before roping out. No damage occurred.						
EFU	SE of Kimball	Kimball	NE	41.2°N 103.62°W	22:59–23:00	0.3 mi (0.48 km)	10 yd (9.1 m)
EFU	An emergency manager reported a brief tornado over an open field.						
EFU	NW of Thurman	Washington	CO	39.6343°N 103.27°W	23:35–23:38	0.34 mi (0.55 km)	50 yd (46 m)
EFU	A brief tornado was reported.						
EFU	N of Thurman	Washington	CO	39.6157°N 103.2374°W	23:41–23:45	0.95 mi (1.53 km)	50 yd (46 m)
EFU	A tornado remained over open country and inflicted no damage.						
EFU	NE of Thurman	Washington	CO	39.6033°N 103.2095°W	23:47–23:48	0.14 mi (0.23 km)	50 yd (46 m)
EFU	This brief tornado caused no damage.						

=== May 22 event ===
List of confirmed tornadoes – Friday, May 22, 2026
EF#	Location	County / Parish	State	Start Coord.	Time (UTC)	Path length	Max width
EF0	N of Midway	Hinds	MS	32.1974°N 90.3785°W	09:37–09:42	1.98 mi (3.19 km)	175 yd (160 m)
EF0	Several large tree limbs were downed.						
EF0	SW of Gilbertown	Choctaw	AL	31.7668°N 88.4604°W	14:28–14:31	1.24 mi (2.00 km)	180 yd (160 m)
EF0	A high-end EF0 tornado caused damage to forested areas south of US 84.						
EF1	N of Coffeeville to SW of Campbell	Clarke	AL	31.8403°N 88.0914°W	14:33–14:42	3.15 mi (5.07 km)	100 yd (91 m)
EF1	This tornado moved through forested terrain east of SR 69, causing a small corridor of tree damage.						
EF1	WSW of Campbell	Clarke	AL	31.9099°N 88.0284°W	14:52–15:01	2.23 mi (3.59 km)	250 yd (230 m)
EF1	A tornado snapped or uprooted trees as it moved through forested areas.						
EF1	W of Gallion to NW of Prairieville	Marengo, Hale	AL	32.5001°N 87.7464°W	15:43–15:50	2.27 mi (3.65 km)	150 yd (140 m)
EF1	This tornado developed east of Demopolis, where it snapped and uprooted several hardwood trees and caused minor damage to a residence. As it moved northeast, it damaged multiple homes by removing shingles and siding, destroyed a shed, scattered yard items, and overturned both a box truck and a pontoon boat. After crossing US 80, the tornado weakened, producing only minor tree damage before dissipating.						
EF0	Exmoor	Marengo	AL	32.0537°N 87.8623°W	15:47–15:48	0.23 mi (0.37 km)	40 yd (37 m)
EF0	A tornado briefly touched down in Exmoor, damaging a manufactured home's porch and awning, shifting a camper off its supports, and snapping or uprooting several trees.						
EF1	NNE of Vance to S of Abernant	Tuscaloosa	AL	33.2105°N 87.2211°W	17:13–17:18	2.65 mi (4.26 km)	150 yd (140 m)
EF1	A tornado touched down just north of I-20/59, initially causing minor tree damage before moving north and producing light damage to a manufactured home. As it crossed wooded and rural areas, the tornado intensified and snapped or uprooted numerous hardwood and softwood trees while causing only minor damage to nearby homes. Farther along its path, it tossed a carport, caused additional minor residential damage, and continued to snap and uproot trees before dissipating in a forested area.						
EF1	WNW of Holly Pond to eastern Brooklyn to S of Hulaco	Cullman	AL	34.1812°N 86.6446°W	17:57–18:14	8.7 mi (14.0 km)	300 yd (270 m)
EF1	This high-end EF1 tornado began just north of US 278 and quickly strengthened, uprooting and snapping numerous hardwood trees while causing minor damage to farm outbuildings. As it moved northeast, it continued to produce widespread tree damage and caused roof damage to several homes in rural communities along its path. Additional impacts included two cattle killed by falling trees, a truck damaged by a fallen tree, and a mobile home pushed off its foundation with significant roof damage. Near the end of its track, the tornado caused sporadic tree damage as it curved toward the intersection of SR 67 and SR 69, before weakening and dissipating.						
EFU	SE of Tahoka	Lynn	TX	33.122°N 101.67°W	21:25	Unknown	Unknown
EFU	A landspout was reported.						
EFU	S of Plainview	Hale	TX	34.159°N 101.699°W	22:02	Unknown	Unknown
EFU	Numerous storm chasers reported a brief landspout.						
EFU	NE of Abernathy	Hale	TX	33.886°N 101.758°W	22:12–22:19	Unknown	Unknown
EFU	A landspout was observed by several storm chasers. No damage was noted.						
EFU	NE of Oto	Woodbury	IA	42.3134°N 95.8822°W	22:16–22:17	0.58 mi (0.93 km)	30 yd (27 m)
EFU	A brief tornado caused no damage.						
EFU	S of Lazbuddie	Bailey	TX	34.309°N 102.62°W	22:27	Unknown	Unknown
EFU	This landspout remained over open country.						
EFU	W of Spade	Lamb	TX	33.929°N 102.195°W	22:34	Unknown	Unknown
EFU	A storm chaser reported a landspout. No damage was reported.						
EFU	E of Murray	Cass	NE	40.9158°N 95.9141°W	22:42–22:43	0.12 mi (0.19 km)	5 yd (4.6 m)
EFU	Multiple trained storm spotters reported a brief, weak tornado.						
EFU	N of Earth	Lamb	TX	34.267°N 102.42°W	22:42	Unknown	Unknown
EFU	A landspout was reported by a storm chaser as it caused no damage.						
EF0	New Tazewell	Claiborne	TN	36.4254°N 83.6081°W	22:58–23:02	1.49 mi (2.40 km)	75 yd (69 m)
EF0	This tornado touched down in New Tazewell, initially causing damage to hardwood trees and minor siding damage to a home before intensifying as it moved into the downtown area. There, several buildings sustained significant damage, including major roof uplift and wall collapse to one structure and the complete collapse of a smaller wooden building, while other businesses suffered minor damage. Numerous power poles were snapped during the tornado's strongest phase at high-end EF0 intensity. The tornado then weakened rapidly, producing only minor roof damage along SR 33 before dissipating.						
EFU	SW of Edmonson	Hale	TX	34.262°N 101.911°W	23:09	Unknown	Unknown
EFU	A landspout was captured by local broadcast media.						
EFU	NE of Hart	Castro	TX	34.422°N 102.066°W	23:09	Unknown	Unknown
EFU	No damage occurred from this landspout.						
EFU	W of Fluvanna	Scurry	TX	32.89°N 101.16°W	23:11–23:18	Unknown	Unknown
EFU	A trained storm spotter reported a landspout.						
EFU	N of Abernathy	Hale	TX	33.9296°N 101.8634°W	23:26–23:28	0.39 mi (0.63 km)	100 yd (91 m)
EFU	A dusty tornado remained over an open field.						
EFU	W of Tulia	Swisher	TX	34.515°N 101.917°W	23:40	Unknown	Unknown
EFU	This landspout occurred over rural land, causing no damage.						
EF0	SW of Morgantown	Butler	KY	37.2026°N 86.7131°W	00:02–00:03	0.3 mi (0.48 km)	30 yd (27 m)
EF0	A brief tornado produced a concentrated path of damage, beginning with snapped treetops and downed large branches before moving into a commercial property where a repair shop sustained extensive roof damage. Roofing material and insulation were torn from the building and carried downwind, with debris scattered across I-165 and into nearby trees and athletic facilities. The tornado dissipated shortly afterward, though lofted debris continued well beyond the end of the damage path.						

=== May 23 event ===
List of confirmed tornadoes – Saturday, May 23, 2026
EF#	Location	County / Parish	State	Start Coord.	Time (UTC)	Path length	Max width
EFU	ENE of Texline	Dallam	TX	36.4°N 102.94°W	22:09	Unknown	Unknown
EFU	A brief landspout was observed.						
EFU	ENE of Plains	Yoakum	TX	33.231°N 102.629°W	00:25–00:28	Unknown	Unknown
EFU	A storm chaser reported a landspout.						
EFU	E of Levelland	Hockley	TX	33.581°N 102.32°W	01:53	Unknown	Unknown
EFU	This landspout was reported by local broadcast media.						
EFU	SW of Little Mountain	Newberry	SC	34.0997°N 81.4798°W	02:15–02:17	0.07 mi (0.11 km)	50 yd (46 m)
EFU	A near-stationary waterspout occurred over Lake Murray and caused no damage.						
EFU	S of Shallowater	Lubbock	TX	33.65°N 101.992°W	02:17	Unknown	Unknown
EFU	A storm chaser documented a landspout. No damage occurred.						

=== May 24 event ===
List of confirmed tornadoes – Sunday, May 24, 2026
EF#	Location	County / Parish	State	Start Coord.	Time (UTC)	Path length	Max width
EF0	Town 'n' Country	Hillsborough	FL	27.9958°N 82.5973°W	22:58–23:01	0.34 mi (0.55 km)	75 yd (69 m)
EF0	A pool enclosure was damaged with a few other nearby structures being lightly damaged. A large tree was uprooted and small debris was lofted around.						
EF0	SW of Ruckersville	Elbert	GA	34.1396°N 82.8113°W	00:17–00:21	1.67 mi (2.69 km)	15 yd (14 m)
EF0	Several large trees and tree branches were downed.						

=== May 25 event ===
List of confirmed tornadoes – Monday, May 25, 2026
EF#	Location	County / Parish	State	Start Coord.	Time (UTC)	Path length	Max width
EFU	E of Snowflake	Apache	AZ	34.51°N 109.81°W	21:00–21:04	0.5 mi (0.80 km)	100 yd (91 m)
EFU	A landspout was documented on two separate Arizona Public Service cameras. It remained over open country.						
EF1	SE of Bluewater Bay	Walton	FL	30.458°N 86.3872°W	21:07–21:10	0.32 mi (0.51 km)	150 yd (140 m)
EF1	A waterspout made landfall from Choctawhatchee Bay into Villa Tasso, where it snapped and uprooted numerous hardwood trees. Most structural damage occurred when trees fell onto homes and other property, although one residence lost a substantial portion of its roof. The tornado also caused trees to fall onto a vehicle before quickly dissipating.						
EF1	Cowarts to W of Grandberry Crossroads	Houston, Henry	AL	31.2032°N 85.3187°W	00:22–00:49	11.09 mi (17.85 km)	200 yd (180 m)
EF1	This tornado touched down just north of US 84 in Cowarts, damaging trees, outbuildings, and a few homes, including a pool enclosure. As it crossed SR 52, it damaged the WDHN television station by breaking windows and damaging the roof. The tornado then continued north-northeast producing additional tree damage and minor structural impacts. The most significant damage occurred farther along the path, where two homes were heavily damaged and one was destroyed after being displaced from its foundation and collapsing. The tornado then weakened and eventually dissipated.						

=== May 26 event ===
List of confirmed tornadoes – Tuesday, May 26, 2026
EF#	Location	County / Parish	State	Start Coord.	Time (UTC)	Path length	Max width
EFU	Hereford	Deaf Smith	TX	34.82°N 102.41°W	16:00	Unknown	Unknown
EFU	A landspout occurred in Hereford but caused no damage.						
EF0	N of Parrish	Manatee	FL	27.6123°N 82.4225°W	21:37–21:38	0.24 mi (0.39 km)	25 yd (23 m)
EF0	This tornado touched down just west of US 301, where it damaged a fence. A nearby resident witnessed debris being lofted in an open field before the tornado dissipated.						
EF0	SE of Jiménez, COA	Maverick	TX	29.0314°N 100.6361°W	22:19–22:22	0.52 mi (0.84 km)	25 yd (23 m)
EF0	A few small tree limbs were broken.						
EF1	N of New Berlin	Guadalupe	TX	29.5052°N 98.0991°W	03:20–03:25	2.91 mi (4.68 km)	70 yd (64 m)
EF1	A tornado caused widespread tree damage.						

=== May 27 event ===
List of confirmed tornadoes – Wednesday, May 27, 2026
EF#	Location	County / Parish	State	Start Coord.	Time (UTC)	Path length	Max width
EF1	Antlers	Pushmataha	OK	34.2306°N 95.6147°W	20:07–20:08	0.7 mi (1.1 km)	100 yd (91 m)
EF1	This tornado struck Antlers, damaging a hospital, uprooting a tree, blowing down privacy fences, and snapping numerous tree limbs.						
EFU	NW of Hills, MN to N of Benclare, SD	Rock (MN), Minnehaha (SD)	MN, SD	43.5509°N 96.4041°W	22:17–22:26	3.47 mi (5.58 km)	40 yd (37 m)
EFU	This highly-visible landspout moved west-southwest through open fields, causing no damage.						
EFU	SW of Hugo	Choctaw	OK	33.9935°N 95.5518°W	23:45	0.1 mi (0.16 km)	50 yd (46 m)
EFU	A brief tornado was observed by several people as it inflicted no damage.						

=== May 29 event ===
List of confirmed tornadoes – Friday, May 29, 2026
EF#	Location	County / Parish	State	Start Coord.	Time (UTC)	Path length	Max width
EF0	NNW of Hammond	St. Lawrence	NY	44.4959°N 75.718°W	22:07–22:08	0.09 mi (0.14 km)	40 yd (37 m)
EF0	A brief tornado was recorded as it toppled an apple tree.						

=== May 30 event ===
List of confirmed tornadoes – Saturday, May 30, 2026
EF#	Location	County / Parish	State	Start Coord.	Time (UTC)	Path length	Max width
EFU	SSE of Bushnell	Kimball	NE	41.09°N 103.86°W	22:25–22:27	0.5 mi (0.80 km)	10 yd (9.1 m)
EFU	A brief tornado kicked up dirt and dust in open fields.						
EFU	SSW of Oliver	Kimball	NE	41.13°N 103.8°W	23:55–23:56	0.2 mi (0.32 km)	10 yd (9.1 m)
EFU	A tornado lasted thirty seconds over open fields and caused no damage.						
EFU	NNW of Wauneta to SSW of Holyoke	Yuma, Phillips	CO	40.3783°N 102.3375°W	00:00–00:18	7.33 mi (11.80 km)	50 yd (46 m)
EFU	This tornado remained over pastures and fields. No damage was noted.						
EFU	NNE of Madrid	Perkins	NE	40.98°N 101.5°W	00:00		
EFU	A landspout was photographed and recorded. No damage occurred.						
EFU	N of Wellfleet	Lincoln	NE	40.88°N 100.76°W	00:28	0.01 mi (0.016 km)	10 yd (9.1 m)
EFU	A brief tornado caused no damage.						

=== May 31 event ===
List of confirmed tornadoes – Sunday, May 31, 2026
EF#	Location	County / Parish	State	Start Coord.	Time (UTC)	Path length	Max width
EFU	N of Bridgewater	McCook	SD	43.5654°N 97.4987°W	23:06–23:07	0.47 mi (0.76 km)	40 yd (37 m)
EFU	This tornado occurred over an open field. No damage occurred.						
EF0	NE of Bridgewater	McCook	SD	43.566°N 97.4691°W	23:11–23:16	1.19 mi (1.92 km)	75 yd (69 m)
EF0	An old barn was damaged.						
EF0	S of Humboldt	Minnehaha	SD	43.5267°N 97.034°W	01:10–01:12	0.54 mi (0.87 km)	50 yd (46 m)
EF0	This weak tornado impacted a farmstead, damaging two barns and a fence. Several large tree limbs were also downed before the tornado moved over open fields and lifted.						
EF0	NE of Centerville (1st tornado)	Lincoln	SD	43.1773°N 96.8985°W	01:50–01:57	1.98 mi (3.19 km)	75 yd (69 m)
EF0	A tornado caused minor damage to trees.						
EF1	NE of Centerville (2nd tornado)	Lincoln	SD	43.1808°N 96.8411°W	01:58–01:59	0.26 mi (0.42 km)	75 yd (69 m)
EF1	One barn was destroyed and another was heavily damaged.						
EFU	NW of Madison	Greenwood	KS	43.1808°N 96.8411°W	02:43–02:49	0.13 mi (0.21 km)	15 yd (14 m)
EFU	A few storm chasers observed a tornado. No damage occurred.						

== June ==
Confirmed tornadoes by Enhanced Fujita rating
EFU	EF0	EF1	EF2	EF3	EF4	EF5	Total
64	121	140	20	6	0	0	351

=== June 1 event ===
List of confirmed tornadoes – Monday, June 1, 2026
EF#	Location	County / Parish	State	Start Coord.	Time (UTC)	Path length	Max width
EFU	N of Scottsbluff	Scotts Bluff	NE	41.97°N 103.69°W	22:32–22:33	0.31 mi (0.50 km)	200 yd (180 m)
EFU	A dusty tornado was observed by a storm chaser west of N-71. No damage was noted.						

=== June 2 event ===
List of confirmed tornadoes – Tuesday, June 2, 2026
EF#	Location	County / Parish	State	Start Coord.	Time (UTC)	Path length	Max width
EFU	NW of Horse Creek (1st tornado)	Albany	WY	41.57°N 105.32°W	19:26–19:36	0.41 mi (0.66 km)	20 yd (18 m)
EFU	A landspout tracked southeast over open country.						
EFU	NW of Horse Creek (2nd tornado)	Albany	WY	41.55°N 105.31°W	19:39–19:44	0.29 mi (0.47 km)	10 yd (9.1 m)
EFU	This landspout remained over rural terrain, causing no damage.						
EFU	NW of Horse Creek (3rd tornado)	Albany	WY	41.54°N 105.31°W	19:46–19:58	0.95 mi (1.53 km)	20 yd (18 m)
EFU	A dusty landspout caused no damage.						

=== June 3 event ===
List of confirmed tornadoes – Wednesday, June 3, 2026
EF#	Location	County / Parish	State	Start Coord.	Time (UTC)	Path length	Max width
EFU	W of Smith Center	Smith	KS	39.78°N 98.83°W	16:39		
EFU	A landspout was captured in a photo. No damage occurred.						
EF1	NNE of New Witten to ENE of Ideal	Tripp	SD	43.56°N 100.02°W	01:00–01:24	10.14 mi (16.32 km)	462 yd (422 m)
EF1	This tornado was documented by numerous storm chasers. Several outbuildings had their roofs damaged.						

=== June 4 event ===
List of confirmed tornadoes – Thursday, June 4, 2026
EF#	Location	County / Parish	State	Start Coord.	Time (UTC)	Path length	Max width
EFU	S of Cawker City	Mitchell	KS	39.46°N 98.44°W	18:44		
EFU	A brief tornado was observed at the southwest corner of Waconda Lake. No known damage occurred.						
EF2	Eastern Riley to S of Randolph	Riley	KS	39.2954°N 96.8234°W	22:13–22:23	3.84 mi (6.18 km)	60 yd (55 m)
EF2	A strong tornado completely destroyed a well-constructed barn and snapped or uprooted several trees.						

=== June 5 event ===
List of confirmed tornadoes – Friday, June 5, 2026
EF#	Location	County / Parish	State	Start Coord.	Time (UTC)	Path length	Max width
EF0	E of Ridgeville	Monroe	WI	43.8906°N 90.5336°W	01:32–01:37	3.11 mi (5.01 km)	50 yd (46 m)
EF0	A few trees were damaged.						
EFU	W of Hobbs	Lea	NM	32.84°N 103.61°W	01:35–01:39	Unknown	Unknown
EFU	A landspout was recorded as it remained over open terrain.						
EF0	NW of Pleasantville	Warren	IA	41.40°N 93.39°W	04:13–04:18	1.32 mi (2.12 km)	
EF0	An EF0 tornado was confirmed by NWS Des Moines. Preliminary information.						
EF0	S of Cumberland to SW of Massena	Cass	IA	41.1879°N 94.8676°W	04:13–04:18	2.3 mi (3.7 km)	25 yd (23 m)
EF0	This tornado slowly tracked eastward damaging trees, outbuildings, and a home before turning north and dissipating.						

=== June 6 event ===
List of confirmed tornadoes – Saturday, June 6, 2026
EF#	Location	County / Parish	State	Start Coord.	Time (UTC)	Path length	Max width
EF1	SW of Beallsville	Washington	PA	40.0407°N 80.0708°W	18:38–18:40	1.24 mi (2.00 km)	250 yd (230 m)
EF1	This tornado partially destroyed a barn, snapped numerous trees and caused minor porch damage to a home.						
EF1	Cokeburg to SW of Twilight	Washington	PA	40.0971°N 80.0673°W	18:40–18:49	7.28 mi (11.72 km)	400 yd (370 m)
EF1	An intermittent tornado snapped and uprooted numerous trees, including a tree that fell onto a home and damaged its roof.						
EF1	Centerville to West Brownsville	Washington	PA	40.04°N 80.01°W	18:44–18:50	0.56 mi (0.90 km)	350 yd (320 m)
EF1	Hundreds trees were downed, snapped, or uprooted.						
EF1	ENE of Brownsville	Fayette	PA	40.0257°N 79.8613°W	18:50–18:51	0.43 mi (0.69 km)	75 yd (69 m)
EF1	A home had shingle damage and multiple small trees were downed.						
EF1	S of Perryopolis to Vanderbilt	Fayette	PA	40.0562°N 79.7553°W	18:57–19:02	5.11 mi (8.22 km)	100 yd (91 m)
EF1	This tornado uprooted several trees and inflicted shingle damage to homes.						
EF1	N of Perryopolis to WNW of Scottdale	Fayette, Westmoreland	PA	40.1101°N 79.7424°W	19:00–19:05	5.2 mi (8.4 km)	400 yd (370 m)
EF1	A high-end EF1 tornado snapped or uprooted numerous trees.						
EF1	W of Witcherville	Sebastian	AR	35.12°N 94.276°W	00:27–00:32	1.7 mi (2.7 km)	500 yd (460 m)
EF1	A couple of outbuildings were damaged, trees were uprooted, and numerous large tree limbs were snapped.						
EF1	SW of Greenwood	Sebastian	AR	35.17°N 94.291°W	00:37–00:45	2.4 mi (3.9 km)	300 yd (270 m)
EF1	This tornado uprooted trees, damaged an outbuilding and snapped tree limbs.						
EF1	N of Barling	Crawford	AR	35.368°N 94.293°W	01:32–01:38	1.3 mi (2.1 km)	250 yd (230 m)
EF1	A few trees were uprooted and multiple large tree limbs were broken.						

=== June 7 event ===
List of confirmed tornadoes – Sunday, June 7, 2026
EF#	Location	County / Parish	State	Start Coord.	Time (UTC)	Path length	Max width
EFU	NE of Pine Bluffs, WY	Kimball	NE	41.2013°N 104.0339°W	20:54–20:55	0.1 mi (0.16 km)	10 yd (9.1 m)
EFU	A landspout was observed over an open field.						
EFU	E of Hillsdale	Laramie	WY	41.21°N 104.44°W	21:07		
EFU	This landspout was photographed. No damage occurred.						
EF0	E of Battlefield	Greene	MO	37.0966°N 93.3536°W	23:38–23:45	1.72 mi (2.77 km)	50 yd (46 m)
EF0	This weak tornado downed a few tree limbs.						
EF0	NE of Spokane	Christian	MO	36.8829°N 93.2842°W	00:03–00:06	0.94 mi (1.51 km)	50 yd (46 m)
EF0	A narrow path of tree damage occurred.						
EF1	E of Sparta	Christian	MO	36.9937°N 93.0634°W	00:48–00:56	2.3 mi (3.7 km)	333 yd (304 m)
EF1	A mobile home and another home were damaged. Several trees and tree limbs were downed.						
EF0	ESE of Rogersville	Webster	MO	37.0972°N 93.0022°W	01:19–01:20	0.4 mi (0.64 km)	50 yd (46 m)
EF0	No damage was found but a TDS was observed on radar.						
EF1	ESE of Keltner to ESE of Dogwood	Douglas	MO	36.9517°N 92.8806°W	01:47–02:12	8.86 mi (14.26 km)	400 yd (370 m)
EF1	This tornado inflicted minor damage to outbuildings, pushed a mobile home several feet off its foundation, and uprooted and snapped multiple trees. Later, a farm outbuilding was significantly damaged, and more trees were extensively damaged.						
EF1	SE of Bowbells	Burke, Ward	ND	48.7762°N 102.205°W	01:50–01:54	3.26 mi (5.25 km)	50 yd (46 m)
EF1	This dusty tornado knocked over a grain bin and sheared off the tops of pine trees before lifting to the west of the Des Lacs River.						
EFU	S of Berthold	Ward	ND	48.1691°N 101.7493°W	02:37–02:40	0.49 mi (0.79 km)	50 yd (46 m)
EFU	A rope tornado touched down and caused no damage.						

=== June 8 event ===
List of confirmed tornadoes – Monday, June 8, 2026
EF#	Location	County / Parish	State	Start Coord.	Time (UTC)	Path length	Max width
EFU	NW of Lipscomb	Lipscomb	TX	36.3°N 100.43°W	22:02–22:12	Unknown	Unknown
EFU	This landspout caused no damage.						
EFU	S of Lyman	Scotts Bluff	NE	41.84°N 104.04°W	22:15–22:17	0.79 mi (1.27 km)	15 yd (14 m)
EFU	A landspout remained over open fields.						
EFU	E of Salina	Saline	KS	38.8501°N 97.5408°W	01:38–01:39	0.05 mi (0.080 km)	15 yd (14 m)
EFU	A brief tornado occurred over an open field.						
EF1	NNW of Carlton	Dickinson	KS	38.762°N 97.3292°W	02:37–02:50	3.81 mi (6.13 km)	150 yd (140 m)
EF1	Corn was flattened, and tree branches were broken by this high-end EF1 tornado.						

=== June 9 event ===
List of confirmed tornadoes – Tuesday, June 9, 2026
EF#	Location	County / Parish	State	Start Coord.	Time (UTC)	Path length	Max width
EF0	SE of Topeka	Shawnee	KS	38.92°N 95.6°W	06:02–06:07	2.63 mi (4.23 km)	50 yd (46 m)
EF0	Mobile homes and tree limbs were damaged.						
EF0	Northeastern Lawrence	Douglas	KS	38.975°N 95.2242°W	06:24–06:26	0.55 mi (0.89 km)	30 yd (27 m)
EF0	An intermittent tornado snapped the tops of trees.						
EF0	Western Grand Ledge	Eaton	MI	42.726°N 84.781°W	14:30–14:37	3.21 mi (5.17 km)	50 yd (46 m)
EF0	Trees were damaged, a storage outbuilding was destroyed, and some additional minor property damage occurred, mainly due to fallen trees.						
EF1	Eastern Freeland	Saginaw	MI	43.5229°N 84.1094°W	17:11–17:14	1.43 mi (2.30 km)	100 yd (91 m)
EF1	This tornado touched down in Freeland, damaging up to forty homes and several commercial buildings. Tree and outbuilding damage were observed along the path, along with several recreational vehicles that were flipped and moved.						
EFU	NE of Montrose	Genesee	MI	43.21°N 83.85°W	17:19	0.1 mi (0.16 km)	10 yd (9.1 m)
EFU	A tornado was observed over farmland by a storm spotter. No damage occurred.						
EFU	ESE of Noonan	Divide	ND	48.8802°N 102.9438°W	00:20–00:22	0.25 mi (0.40 km)	50 yd (46 m)
EFU	This brief tornado was reported by a storm chaser.						

=== June 10 event ===
List of confirmed tornadoes – Wednesday, June 10, 2026
EF#	Location	Region	State/Province	Start coord.	Time (UTC)	Path length	Max. width
EFU	NE of Henry	Codington	SD		05:06	0.05 mi (0.080 km)	1 yd (0.91 m)
EFU	A brief tornado caused no damage.						
EFU	NE of Sunburg	Kandiyohi	MN		07:07		
EFU	A tornado was recorded. No damage occurred.						
EF0	Lomira	Dodge	WI		20:01–20:02	0.72 mi (1.16 km)	75 yd (69 m)
EF0	Several homes and mobile homes sustained roof damage. Trees were also damaged, including a few that were uprooted.						
EF0	SE of Maple Park	Kane	IL		20:01–20:03	1.35 mi (2.17 km)	50 yd (46 m)
EF0	This tornado severely damaged an outbuilding at a family farm and snapped several small trees on the property. Afterwards, a large pole barn was damaged at a winery.						
EF0	SSE of Eden	Fond du Lac	WI		20:10–20:12	0.94 mi (1.51 km)	75 yd (69 m)
EF0	Several trees were damaged, including a few that were uprooted, along with numerous limbs downed. A barn was also damaged, with roofing material blown hundreds of yards downwind.						
EF1	E of Mercer to SW of Cleopatra	Mercer	MO		20:29–20:35	2.54 mi (4.09 km)	100 yd (91 m)
EF1	This tornado destroyed a garage and a barn, inflicted minor roof damage to a home, and snapped numerous trees.						
EF0	N of Princeton to S of Mercer	Mercer	MO		20:43–20:46	3.52 mi (5.66 km)	100 yd (91 m)
EF0	This high-end EF0 tornado crossed US 65 as it moved northeastward, damaging trees and leaning power poles.						
EF0	Alsip	Cook	IL		20:56–20:58	1.48 mi (2.38 km)	175 yd (160 m)
EF0	Several trees and power poles downed.						
EF0	NNW of Weatherby to NE of Alta Vista	DeKalb, Daviess	MO		20:56–21:03	4.35 mi (7.00 km)	75 yd (69 m)
EF0	This tornado damaged trees before dissipating along Route KK.						
EF2	SSE of Lucerne to SW of Unionville	Putnam	MO		20:57–21:12	8.38 mi (13.49 km)	300 yd (270 m)
EF2	This strong tornado formed south-southeast of Lucerne and moved east-northeastward, initially snapping tree limbs. Shortly afterward, the tornado hit a farmstead at EF1 intensity, inflicting minor damage to the house, damaging three metal pole barns, destroying a chicken coop and two empty grain bins, damaging trees, and snapping two wooden power poles. After causing some additional tree damage as it moved through Terre Haute and crossed Route K, the tornado briefly reached low-end EF2 intensity, damaging or destroying an expansive pole barn and two of three grain bins. The tornado then gradually turned eastward, damaging more outbuildings and trees. The tornado then reached its peak intensity of mid-range EF2 as it crossed Route EE, obliterating a mobile home. Afterwards, the tornado rapidly weakened, causing some additional tree damage before lifting shortly after south of US 136.						
EF0	N of Lake Viking to SE of Jameson	Daviess	MO		21:13–21:22	5.45 mi (8.77 km)	75 yd (69 m)
EF0	This tornado formed shortly after the Alta Vista tornado dissipated. It moved east-northeastward and crossed Route DD, damaging trees and a manufactured home along its path.						
EF1	ESE of Jameson to NNE of Jamesport	Daviess	MO		21:25–21:39	10.48 mi (16.87 km)	200 yd (180 m)
EF1	This tornado formed just east of Route 13, moved northeastward, and crossed Route P. It destroyed a pole barn and damaged trees before dissipating shortly after crossing Route 190.						
EF0	S of Chariton	Putnam	MO		21:49–21:51	0.66 mi (1.06 km)	75 yd (69 m)
EF0	This weak tornado caused minor roof damage to a home and an outbuilding and inflicted sporadic damage to trees.						
EF0	NNW of Laredo	Grundy	MO		22:09–22:10	0.93 mi (1.50 km)	50 yd (46 m)
EF0	Trees suffered minor damage.						
EF0	Western Galt	Grundy	MO		22:18–22:19	0.67 mi (1.08 km)	100 yd (91 m)
EF0	Trees and a few grain bins were damaged.						
EF0	SW of Bloomfield	Davis	IA		22:23–22:26	0.54 mi (0.87 km)	25 yd (23 m)
EF0	An EF0 tornado was confirmed by NWS Des Moines. Preliminary information.						
EF0	W of Millard to S of Bullion	Adair	MO		23:36–23:43	6.79 mi (10.93 km)	75 yd (69 m)
EF0	This tornado initially inflicted minor damage to a solar panel array and trees as it traveled northeastward. It then turned east-northeastward and crossed US 63, moving through open country before turning back to the northeast. It then caused some minor tree damage before dissipating south of Route 6.						
EF0	E of Abilene to WNW of Enterprise	Dickinson	KS		00:12–00:15	1.48 mi (2.38 km)	50 yd (46 m)
EF0	A weak tornado damaged trees.						
EF0	N of Navarre	Dickinson	KS		00:45–00:48	1.48 mi (2.38 km)	50 yd (46 m)
EF0	Minor property and tree damage occurred.						
EF1	E of Shady Brook	Dickinson	KS		01:17–01:20	0.46 mi (0.74 km)	75 yd (69 m)
EF1	A garage door was blown in and an outbuilding and surrounding trees were damaged.						
EFU	N of Nickerson	Reno	KS		02:21–02:23	0.05 mi (0.080 km)	20 yd (18 m)
EFU	A brief tornado was captured on video.						
EF1	NE of Tallula to ESE of Lewisburg	Menard	IL		03:49–03:55	4.82 mi (7.76 km)	150 yd (140 m)
EF1	A tornado began by damaging several trees and a grain bin. It tracked due east through Lincoln's New Salem State Park, damaging numerous trees and removing shingles from a home. The tornado then crossed IL 97, damaging more trees in a neighborhood before lifting.						
EF1	Southwestern Athens	Menard	IL		03:59–04:03	2.53 mi (4.07 km)	200 yd (180 m)
EF1	Numerous trees were snapped.						
EF1	Northern Springfield to Mechanicsburg to NW of Mount Auburn	Sangamon	IL		04:04–04:30	24.04 mi (38.69 km)	250 yd (230 m)
EF1	This high-end EF1 tornado began west of Abraham Lincoln Capital Airport and moved almost due east, initially snapping trees and tree branches. The tornado then struck the airport, lofting 6,000 lb (2,700 kg) aircraft hangars and rolling an enclosed trailer as it crossed IL 29. After snapping more trees, turning east-southeastward, and crossing IL 4/IL 29, the tornado inflicted significant damage at an animal shelter, where a large metal building had the entire southern part of its roof removed, while the main office had part of its roof removed along with a partially collapsed exterior wall with debris strewn downwind in a field. It also snapped more trees along with wooden power poles. The tornado then crossed I-55 Bus./IL 29 and continued to snap and uproot trees and inflict minor damage to homes as it moved east-southeastward through neighborhoods in the northern part of Springfield. It then crossed I-55 and IL 54 as it exited Springfield and continued east-southeastward, inflicting minor damage to a church and snapping more trees and power poles as it moved through the Camp Butler National Cemetery. The tornado then crossed I-72 and the Sangamon River and struck a small community southeast of Riverton, damaging or destroying outbuildings, flipping and throwing a small trailer 30 ft (9.1 m), snapping more trees, and strewing debris through open fields and into trees. Continuing east-southeastward, the tornado caused minor tree damage as it moved through rural farmland before striking Mechanicsburg, where it snapped more trees and power poles, partially destroyed a farm outbuilding, and inflicted minor damage to homes. The tornado then continued to damage, snap, or uproot trees and snap power poles as it moved further east-southeastward before dissipating just north of the Sangamon River.						
EF1	NNW of Mount Pulaski to N of Forsyth	Logan, Macon	IL		04:19–04:42	19.58 mi (31.51 km)	170 yd (160 m)
EF1	Trees were damaged, wooden power poles were leaned, and outbuildings suffered minor damage.						
EF0	Argenta to S of Cisco	Macon, Piatt	IL		04:50–04:57	7.57 mi (12.18 km)	100 yd (91 m)
EF0	Trees and outbuildings were damaged.						

=== June 11 event ===
List of confirmed tornadoes – Thursday, June 11, 2026
EF#	Location	Region	State/Province	Start coord.	Time (UTC)	Path length	Max. width
EF1	E of Cerro Gordo to SSW of Ivesdale	Piatt	IL		05:02–05:08	9.93 mi (15.98 km)	70 yd (64 m)
EF1	A camper was flipped and destroyed, a grain storage building was unroofed, a couple of outbuildings, a grain bin, and trees were damaged, two power poles were snapped, and rotational marks were left in corn fields.						
EF1	E of Weeping Water (1st tornado)	Cass	NE		10:10–10:14	1.97 mi (3.17 km)	40 yd (37 m)
EF1	A farm building had its walls collapsed and trees were damaged.						
EF0	E of Weeping Water (2nd tornado)	Cass	NE		10:15–10:16	0.34 mi (0.55 km)	20 yd (18 m)
EF0	A very brief, weak tornado caused some light tree damage.						
EF1	N of Union	Cass	NE		10:21–10:24	2 mi (3.2 km)	40 yd (37 m)
EF1	At its touchdown point, this low-end EF1 tornado damaged a home and caused extensive tree damage in the surrounding area. More sporadic and weak tree damage occurred as the tornado moved southeastward and crossed US 34 before dissipating.						
EF1	WNW of McPaul	Fremont	IA		10:29–10:31	1.54 mi (2.48 km)	30 yd (27 m)
EF1	This tornado initially produced minor tree damage as it tracked east-southeastward. Right before reaching I-29, the tornado reached high-end EF1 intensity, ripping a large section of the roof off a residence, with some exterior walls also being knocked down. The tornado then quickly weakened and dissipated after crossing I-29 and causing some more tree damage.						
EF0	NW of Tabor	Mills	IA		10:33–10:35	1.65 mi (2.66 km)	20 yd (18 m)
EF0	A very brief, weak tornado produced sporadic tree damage.						
EF1	ESE of Coburg to NNW of Hepburn	Page	IA		10:58–11:08	7.1 mi (11.4 km)	100 yd (91 m)
EF1	This low-end EF1 tornado inflicted minor damage to one outbuilding, ripped the roof off another one and tossed it and grain bins out into fields, and damaged, snapped, or uprooted trees.						
EF1	ESE of Stanton to NNE of Villisca	Montgomery	IA		11:08–11:16	5.16 mi (8.30 km)	75 yd (69 m)
EF1	This tornado touched down and moved eastward into the Viking Lake State Park, snapping tree limbs and uprooting trees. The tornado then crossed Viking Lake and intensified, uprooting two large trees, snapping tree limbs, inflicting minor roof and siding damage to a home, and snapping 10 pine trees. The tornado then intensified further to its peak intensity as it continued eastward, collapsing an outbuilding, snapping another large tree, and downing power lines. The tornado then lofted grain bins for over a mile before depositing them at the US 34 interchange with US 71. The tornado then partially removed the roof of another home before abruptly dissipating.						
EF1	SSE of Villisca	Page	IA		11:11–11:13	1.87 mi (3.01 km)	50 yd (46 m)
EF1	A low-end EF1 tornado destroyed a carport, removed part of the roof and a wall from an outbuilding, and damaged trees.						
EF2	SSE of Corning to SSE Prescott	Adams	IA		11:26–11:32	6.02 mi (9.69 km)	200 yd (180 m)
EF2	This strong tornado touched down about 5 mi (8.0 km) southeast of Corning, ripping much of the roof off a home and destroying its attached garage. Moving northeast, it caused sporadic tree damage, snapped wooden power poles near Notchwood, and broke several dual-legged power poles. Additional tree and minor structural damage occurred before the tornado dissipated north of US 34.						
EFU	NNW of Ainsworth	Washington	IA		21:05–21:06	0.05 mi (0.080 km)	10 yd (9.1 m)
EFU	A thin tornado remained over a field.						
EFU	N of Middle Creek	Hancock	IL		21:15–21:17	0.22 mi (0.35 km)	10 yd (9.1 m)
EFU	Multiple chasers and spotters reported a brief tornado that caused no damage.						
EFU	NW of Macomb	McDonough	IL		21:54–21:55	0.08 mi (0.13 km)	10 yd (9.1 m)
EFU	A storm chaser recorded a short-lived condensation funnel. No damage occurred.						
EF3	E of Rome to SSW of La Rose	Woodford, Marshall	IL		21:56–22:15	10.97 mi (17.65 km)	930 yd (850 m)
EF3	See section on this tornado						
EF0	Ipava	Fulton	IL		22:17-22:22	2.36 mi (3.80 km)	30 yd (27 m)
EF0	Numerous storm chasers and storm spotters observed a very weak tornado that tossed a few solar panels at a solar farm before continuing into Ipava, where it dissipated and caused no damage in the village.						
EFU	NW of Canton	Fulton	IL		22:31–22:32	0.16 mi (0.26 km)	20 yd (18 m)
EFU	A brief tornado tracked through an open field, causing no damage.						
EF1	ESE of Wenona to S of Garfield	LaSalle	IL		22:31–22:41	4.4 mi (7.1 km)	500 yd (460 m)
EF1	The high-end EF1 tornado struck farmsteads outside of the town of Wenona, shattering windows, snapping trees and power poles, and leveling a garage.						
EF3	Long Point to Ancona to Eastern Streator	Livingston, La Salle	IL		22:32-22:59	11.9 mi (19.2 km)	600 yd (550 m)
EF3	See section on this tornado – Seven people were injured.						
EF1	N of Pontiac to Odell to WNW of Reddick	Livingston	IL		22:44-23:32	22.8 mi (36.7 km)	900 yd (820 m)
EF1	This long-tracked tornado moved across central Livingston County, producing mostly weak damage that consisted of downed tree limbs and other minor tree damage, including as it crossed I-55 and moved through Odell. After leaving Odell, the tornado strengthened south of Dwight, where it damaged the roofs and siding of several homes and destroyed a couple of barns. The tornado then weakened and dissipated just north of IL 17.						
EFU	WNW of Blackstone	Livingston	IL		22:55–22:56	0.8 mi (1.3 km)	250 yd (230 m)
EFU	This brief tornado caused no recorded damage.						
EFU	NNW of Blackstone	LaSalle	IL		22:58–22:59	0.3 mi (0.48 km)	100 yd (91 m)
EFU	A tornado documented by storm chasers remained over open fields.						
EF1	S of Groveland to southern Morton to NE of Deer Creek	Tazewell, Woodford	IL		23:08-23:18	12.91 mi (20.78 km)	300 yd (270 m)
EF1	This tornado touched down and moved northeast along the southern edge of Morton, snapping numerous tree trunks, some of which fell onto vehicles. As it continued through residential areas, it caused extensive damage to tree limbs and minor roof damage to homes. After crossing I-74, the tornado damaged an outbuilding at a farmstead and continued to produce scattered tree damage until it dissipated after crossing into Woodford County.						
EF1	NW of Kenosha	Kenosha	WI		23:12–23:13	0.49 mi (0.79 km)	75 yd (69 m)
EF1	Two barn outbuilding structures were damaged, with metal roofing material lofted and deposited several hundred yards downwind. Several trees also sustained large limb damage or were damaged or uprooted.						
EFU	SSE of Normandy to W of Walnut	Bureau	IL		23:12–23:14	1.39 mi (2.24 km)	10 yd (9.1 m)
EFU	A tornado was photographed and recorded as it caused no damage.						
EFU	NE of Compton to NE of Lee	Lee, DeKalb	IL		00:01–00:09	6 mi (9.7 km)	50 yd (46 m)
EFU	This tornado caused no recorded damage as it tracked through fields.						
EFU	NE of Smyer	Hockley	TX		00:03	Unknown	Unknown
EFU	A brief landspout was reported.						
EF0	SE of Saybrook to S of Elliott	McLean, Ford	IL		00:06–00:16	10.91 mi (17.56 km)	100 yd (91 m)
EF0	This weak tornado damaged power poles, trees, and an outbuilding in the community of Harpster.						
EFU	E of Leesville	Kankakee	IL		00:08–00:09	0.6 mi (0.97 km)	50 yd (46 m)
EFU	This brief tornado caused no recorded damage.						
EF0	St. John to Schererville	Lake	IN		00:11-00:21	6 mi (9.7 km)	150 yd (140 m)
EF0	Several structures had exterior wall and roofing damage and trees were damaged.						
EF1	Northern Champaign to NW of Mayview	Champaign	IL		00:20-00:30	8.95 mi (14.40 km)	170 yd (160 m)
EF1	Many homes, businesses, outbuildings, and a warehouse suffered roof, solar panel, and fence damage. A small metal tower was knocked over, wooden power poles were snapped, and trees were damaged, snapped, or uprooted.						
EF1	NW of Paxton to SSE of Loda	Ford, Iroquois	IL		00:23–00:30	6.9 mi (11.1 km)	100 yd (91 m)
EF1	This tornado touched down northwest of Paxton and moved northeastward. An outbuilding was destroyed, ejecting debris and wooden boards onto a nearby field. The tornado then crossed I-57, inflicting minimal tree damage. The tornado later leveled another outbuilding, though its structural integrity was likely weakened by a tornado a year earlier. The tornado continued afterwards, unroofing and partially collapsing another outbuilding and peeling shingles off a home before dissipating south-southeast of Loda.						
EF2	Merrillville to Hobart	Lake	IN		00:25–00:37	6.6 mi (10.6 km)	700 yd (640 m)
EF2	See section on this tornado – One person was injured.						
EF1	E of Ludlow to SE of Paxton	Champaign, Ford	IL		00:26–00:29	2.99 mi (4.81 km)	150 yd (140 m)
EF1	This tornado touched down near the Champaign–Ford County line, where it partially removed the roof of an outbuilding and damaged solar panels. After crossing into Ford County, it intensified and caused significant damage at a farmstead, including partial roof loss from a residence, near-destruction of an outbuilding, and numerous snapped trees. The tornado then weakened and dissipated shortly afterwards.						
EF0	Southern Cedar Lake	Lake	IN		00:32–00:38	4.1 mi (6.6 km)	150 yd (140 m)
EF0	This tornado tracked northeastward through a subdivision, inflicting roof and siding damage to homes and tossing outdoor furniture and trash cans. The tornado then tracked east-northeastward through the south side of Cedar Lake, causing primarily tree damage before dissipating.						
EF0	NE of Schneider to S of Hebron	Lake, Porter	IN		00:36-00:58	12.6 mi (20.3 km)	200 yd (180 m)
EF0	This northeastward-moving tornado caused mainly tree damage.						
EF1	WNW of Fithian to western Danville	Vermilion	IL		00:39–00:53	13.49 mi (21.71 km)	100 yd (91 m)
EF1	A tornado paralleled I-74, where it caused significant tree damage in the Kickapoo State Recreation Area. Approximately 250 trees were snapped or uprooted. The tornado continued east and lifted just after entering Danville.						
EF1	Southern Hoopeston to Cheneyville	Vermilion	IL		00:44-00:52	8.07 mi (12.99 km)	100 yd (91 m)
EF1	A tornado touched down south of IL 9 where it overturned an irrigation pivot before crossing IL 1 and damaging the roof of a tractor dealership. As it skirted the southern edge of Hoopeston, it caused tree and roof damage, then strengthened as it continued east, snapping tree trunks, damaging a home's roof, and flattening an outbuilding. Additional tree damage occurred in Cheneyville, while severe wind damage to several buildings near IL 9 was also observed. The tornado weakened and dissipated before reaching the Indiana border.						
EF0	Southern Watseka	Iroquois	IL		00:45-00:47	2.1 mi (3.4 km)	250 yd (230 m)
EF0	Mainly tree damage occurred. A personal weather stationed measured a wind gust of 78 mph (126 km/h).						
EF3	NW of Demotte to S of South Wanatah	Lake, Porter, LaPorte	IN		00:48–01:24	21.81 mi (35.10 km)	450 yd (410 m)
EF3	See section on this tornado						
EF1	NE of Wellington	Iroquois	IL		00:48–00:49	1.2 mi (1.9 km)	50 yd (46 m)
EF1	This brief, weak tornado destroyed an outbuilding and downed power poles.						
EF1	Bartlett	DuPage	IL		00:53-00:57	2.24 mi (3.60 km)	400 yd (370 m)
EF1	This tornado rapidly intensified after developing near Pratt's Wayne Woods and moved into Bartlett, where it caused a concentrated area of damage at a commercial center. Several buildings lost roofing material. Brick columns and metal fencing were blown down and all of the gas pumps at a gas station were overturned. The tornado then continued east-northeast through nearby residential areas, causing extensive tree damage before dissipating in eastern Bartlett.						
EF1	SW of Boswell to Atkinson	Benton	IN		00:58–01:10	12.3 mi (19.8 km)	250 yd (230 m)
EF1	This tornado touched down and moved east-northeastward, damaging an outbuilding and peeling roof shingles off of a house. The tornado then crossed US 41 and blew down a barn and power lines before curving northeastward, blowing a press box off the bleachers at the Daugherty Speedway and flinging it into a power pole and then a field. The tornado then reached its peak intensity as it moved into Chase and crossed a railroad line, destroying a grain elevator and multiple grain bins and snapping a couple of trees along with multiple rows of power poles along SR 352. Another row of power poles was downed as the tornado struck Atkinson after crossing SR 55 and US 52. Northeast of there, the tornado blew down another set of power poles and a few trees, damaged the roof, chimney, and gutters of a home, and blew a chicken coop into a field, killing 30 chickens. The tornado then dissipated shortly thereafter.						
EF0	Ade to SE of Mount Ayr	Newton, Jasper	IN		00:58–01:12	15.5 mi (24.9 km)	200 yd (180 m)
EF0	This high-end EF0 tornado initially snapped branches off of trees and ripped roofing panels off an outbuilding before impacting the community of Ade. Multiple trees had their tree limbs ripped away and an outbuilding sustained significant roof damage. After snapping four power poles, the tornado impacted another farmstead, partially collapsing an outbuilding and inflicting shingle damage to the main farmhouse. A personal weather station at the farmstead recorded an 85 mph (137 km/h) wind gust. The tornado then leveled another outbuilding, snapped tree branches, and snapped a wooden power pole. It then struck another farmstead, destroying a grain bin and throwing the debris into another barn, damaging it. Afterwards, the tornado mainly caused minor to moderate tree damage before dissipating southeast of Mount Ayr.						
EF0	Morocco to SW of Fair Oaks	Newton	IN		00:58–01:10	12.6 mi (20.3 km)	200 yd (180 m)
EF0	The tornado impacted a farmstead southwest of Morocco at high-end EF0 intensity, removing multiple panels from an outbuilding and downing trees and a power pole. Then the tornado went through the town of Morocco, mainly inflicting moderate tree debranching. After exiting town, the tornado mainly caused moderate tree damage and damaged or flipped over irrigation pivots before dissipating.						
EF0	NW of Brisco to NE of Pine Village	Warren	IN		00:59–01:10	10.53 mi (16.95 km)	75 yd (69 m)
EF0	This fast-moving, high-end EF0 tornado initially uprooted softwood trees after touching down. Afterwards, light damage was inflicted on an outbuilding before going through Hooker Corner, uprooting a tree and flattening crops. The tornado continued inflicting minimal damage to trees and an outbuilding before dissipating just short of the Warren/Benton county line.						
EF0	Eastern Naperville to southern Lisle	DuPage	IL		01:04–01:06	1.3 mi (2.1 km)	150 yd (140 m)
EF0	Extensive tree damage occurred, with some trees being snapped or uprooted.						
EF2	S of Willow Springs to Bridgeview to southwestern Chicago	Cook	IL		01:15-01:22	8.4 mi (13.5 km)	350 yd (320 m)
EF2	A strong tornado touched down in the Spears-Pioneer Woods Forest Preserve, initially damaging trees before moving northeast through northern Hickory Hills, where additional trees and utility poles were damaged and homes sustained minor roof damage. After crossing I-294, the tornado strengthened, completely removing the roofs of two apartment buildings in southeastern Justice and causing six injuries on the top floor of one building. Another apartment building lost its roof in Bridgeview, while numerous other buildings sustained at least minor roof damage and widespread tree and utility-pole damage continued. The tornado weakened as it entered Chicago, but continued damaging roofs, siding, and trees through the Clearing and Garfield Ridge neighborhoods and just north of Midway International Airport before dissipating.						
EFU	NW of La Crosse	Porter	IN		01:23–01:24	0.24 mi (0.39 km)	10 yd (9.1 m)
EFU	This satellite tornado of the 0048 UTC EF3 tornado did not produce any known damage.						
EF0	E of Caledonia	Kent	MI		01:31–01:34	4.24 mi (6.82 km)	70 yd (64 m)
EF0	Trees were significantly damaged.						
EF0	S of Middleville to W of Hastings	Barry	MI		01:31–01:34	2.95 mi (4.75 km)	50 yd (46 m)
EF0	Trees were extensively damaged and a house was left covered in branches.						
EF0	S of Yeoman	Carroll	IN		01:31–01:35	3.38 mi (5.44 km)	75 yd (69 m)
EF0	A brief tornado touched down near the Tippecanoe River, causing tree and home damage to several properties. The tornado then turned east, impacting two more homes and a hog farm before dissipating.						
EF0	NE of Lockport	Carroll	IN		01:43–01:44	0.27 mi (0.43 km)	25 yd (23 m)
EF0	A weak tornado downed large tree limbs.						
EF1	N of Georgetown	Cass	IN		01:46–01:48	0.84 mi (1.35 km)	250 yd (230 m)
EF1	The tornado touched down in a forested area north of Georgetown, snapping and uprooting several hardwood trees. An outbuilding sustained significant roof damage. The tornado continued snapping or uprooting trees. The tornado then impacted a farmstead, damaging or demolishing outbuildings and a grain bin, tossing debris into a treeline. The tornado dissipated shortly afterwards.						
EF1	NNW of Adamsboro	Cass	IN		01:58–02:01	1.49 mi (2.40 km)	100 yd (91 m)
EF1	A tornado initially damaged the roof of a barn before moving northeast and leaving a noticeable swath of crop scouring. It then destroyed a large pole barn and caused additional roof damage to several agricultural buildings along its path. The tornado weakened as it continued, producing only minor tree damage before dissipating.						
EF0	Argos	Marshall	IN		02:11–02:15	2.87 mi (4.62 km)	125 yd (114 m)
EF0	This weak tornado inflicted moderate tree damage.						
EF1	E of Plymouth	Marshall	IN		02:11–02:12	0.73 mi (1.17 km)	125 yd (114 m)
EF1	This tornado briefly touched down and uprooted or snapped multiple trees while also damaging a barn. As it moved northeast, it overturned a center-pivot irrigation system and snapped additional trees within a grove before inflicting significant damage to another barn. The tornado then quickly weakened and lifted.						
EF1	Southern Wabash	Wabash	IN		02:22-02:27	4.66 mi (7.50 km)	110 yd (100 m)
EF1	This high-end EF1 tornado began on the southwest side of Wabash, where it snapped multiple wooden power poles before moving northeast into residential areas and damaging numerous homes. Damage included shingle loss, sections of roof decking removed, debris lofted into nearby tree lines, and an overturned camper. Further along its path, the tornado destroyed an outbuilding and reached peak intensity when it damaged several more homes, blowing out windows, removing roof decking, and shifting a manufactured home off its foundation, resulting in two injuries. Afterwards, the damage diminished to mainly downed trees, branches, and power lines before the tornado dissipated.						
EF1	NE of Bourbon	Marshall, Kosciusko	IN		02:22–02:27	3.34 mi (5.38 km)	300 yd (270 m)
EF1	This tornado began by inflicting minor tree damage. It then impacted a farmstead, demolishing two old barns and damaging another one on the property. Several trees were snapped and metal roofing material was torn off. Then the tornado entered Kosciusko County, flipping over a travel trailer and snapping multiple softwood trees before dissipating.						
EF1	W of Harlansburg to ENE of Andrews	Huntington	IN		02:33-02:41	5.83 mi (9.38 km)	75 yd (69 m)
EF1	A tornado damaged multiple properties along its path. Several homes sustained loss of shingles, siding, and roof panels, while numerous trees were damaged or snapped. Additional damage included an outbuilding that lost sections of its roof and a mobile home that lost its roof entirely. The tornado weakened before reaching the Wabash River, with only isolated tree branch damage observed near the end of its path.						
EF1	N of Pleasant Plain to W of Plum Tree	Huntington	IN		02:39–02:48	7.9 mi (12.7 km)	50 yd (46 m)
EF1	This tornado touched down north of Pleasant Plain and produced sporadic tree damage along much of its path, including numerous damaged trees and several trunks snapped well above their bases. Near SR 5 and just northwest of I-69, the tornado reached peak intensity and nearly destroyed a newly built barndominium, leaving only one wall standing and scattering debris more than 100 yd (91 m) into adjacent fields. Additional tree damage occurred as it continued east-northeast before the tornado crossed I-69 and dissipated.						
EF2	Northeastern Elkhart to Bristol	Elkhart	IN		02:42–02:50	6.12 mi (9.85 km)	100 yd (91 m)
EF2	A strong tornado began on the eastern edges of Elkhart, causing minor roof damage to homes and uprooting trees before intensifying as it moved northeast. At its strongest, it destroyed a garage, caused significant roof damage to a nearby residence, displaced a shed, nearly removed the roof from another home, and injured one person. The tornado continued through residential areas and open fields, snapping and uprooting numerous trees and causing minor roof damage to additional homes. Damage lessened to scattered downed branches and trees, although the tornado would continue into Bristol before dissipating.						
EF1	NE of Huntington	Huntington	IN		02:44-02:45	0.65 mi (1.05 km)	25 yd (23 m)
EF1	This tornado briefly touched down east of SR 9, causing severe damage to a single residence where the entire roof was removed and debris was scattered into nearby fields. A detached garage was also destroyed and intense dirt and insulation splatter were observed around the property. The tornado lifted shortly afterward, with little to no damage noted beyond the immediate area.						
EF1	NW of Shipshewana to W of Howe	LaGrange	IN		02:59–03:06	9.89 mi (15.92 km)	1,300 yd (1,200 m)
EF1	This large tornado snapped and uprooted numerous trees, inflicted major roof damage to outbuildings, and flipped or twisted a few irrigation pivots.						
EF0	Balbec	Jay	IN		03:00–03:02	1.14 mi (1.83 km)	75 yd (69 m)
EF0	This tornado began by blowing the roof off a barn and damaging the roof of a nearby home. Several trees were also snapped. The tornado moved northeast, causing further damage to roofs and trees before lifting just as it crossed SR 1.						
EF1	SSE of Rocklane to ENE of Fairland	Johnson, Shelby	IN		03:03–03:19	11.94 mi (19.22 km)	200 yd (180 m)
EF1	This tornado impacted and damaged several homes and outbuildings.						
EF1	E of South Milford to northwestern Angola	LaGrange, Steuben	IN		03:12–03:28	15.12 mi (24.33 km)	250 yd (230 m)
EF1	This tornado caused damage only to trees and power poles as it tracked through rural areas and the western and northern sides of Angola.						
EF0	N of Maxville	Randolph	IN		03:17–03:18	0.32 mi (0.51 km)	25 yd (23 m)
EF0	A home had an awning ripped off, an RV was rotated and pushed, and a 500-gallon propane tank was ripped off a concrete block.						

=== June 12 event ===
List of confirmed tornadoes – Friday, June 12, 2026
EF#	Location	County/Parish	State	Start coord.	Time (UTC)	Path length	Max. width
EFU	ESE of Lonoke to SSW of Carlisle	Lonoke	AR	34.7307°N 91.7778°W	22:37–22:41	3.12 mi (5.02 km)	50 yd (46 m)
EFU	A well-documented landspout tracked southeast through open fields, causing no damage.						

=== June 13 event ===
List of confirmed tornadoes – Saturday, June 13, 2026
EF#	Location	County/Parish	State	Start coord.	Time (UTC)	Path length	Max. width
EF0	SSW of Avondale to SE of River Bend	Clay, Jackson	MO	39.1449°N 94.5487°W	01:34–01:50	9.24 mi (14.87 km)	200 yd (180 m)
EF0	Trees were damaged.						
EF0	Liberty	Clay	MO	39.2425°N 94.419°W	01:47–01:54	3.43 mi (5.52 km)	100 yd (91 m)
EF0	A porta-potty was knocked over, and trees were uprooted or damaged.						
EF1	SE of Carthage	Jasper	MO	37.0645°N 94.2954°W	04:24–04:25	1.23 mi (1.98 km)	150 yd (140 m)
EF1	This tornado snapped and uprooted multiple trees, with one falling onto a home and causing significant roof and structural damage.						
EF0	NE of Pioneer to S of Monett	Barry	MO	36.8555°N 94.0111°W	04:48–04:54	4.77 mi (7.68 km)	150 yd (140 m)
EF0	The tornado snapped and uprooted multiple trees. Two outbuildings were leveled, and sheet metal was tossed 300 yd (270 m).						
EF0	N of Butterfield	Barry	MO	36.7547°N 93.9279°W	04:54–05:03	6.64 mi (10.69 km)	350 yd (320 m)
EF0	This tornado snapped old power poles, uprooted multiple trees, and snapped tree branches.						

=== June 14 event ===
List of confirmed tornadoes – Sunday, June 14, 2026
EF#	Location	County/Parish	State	Start coord.	Time (UTC)	Path length	Max. width
EF0	Western Conneautville	Crawford	PA	41.7567°N 80.3768°W	20:10–20:11	0.52 mi (0.84 km)	100 yd (91 m)
EF0	Trees were uprooted and large tree limbs were snapped.						
EF1	SE of Woodcock to N of Blooming Valley	Crawford	PA	41.7236°N 80.0556°W	20:28–20:29	0.76 mi (1.22 km)	75 yd (69 m)
EF1	Several large trees were uprooted and fell on a detached garage. A power pole was snapped, additional trees were snapped or uprooted, and leaves and hay debris were blown into the side of a barn and other nearby structures.						
EF1	SE of Woodcock	Crawford	PA	41.7347°N 80.0592°W	20:29–20:30	0.52 mi (0.84 km)	50 yd (46 m)
EF1	Another tornado occurred just north of the previous one. Several trees were snapped or uprooted, including one that clipped and damaged a well-constructed detached garage.						
EF2	NE of Oliveburg to NE of Anita	Jefferson	PA	41.0042°N 79.013°W	20:36–20:49	3.76 mi (6.05 km)	300 yd (270 m)
EF2	Severe tree damage occurred on a hillside with many trees snapped or uprooted. Minor home and barn damage was also noted.						
EF1	N of Cochranton	Crawford	PA	41.5789°N 80.0462°W	20:51–20:54	2.18 mi (3.51 km)	50 yd (46 m)
EF1	At one residence, a home suffered significant roof damage along with the loss of its attached porch. Four vehicles were damaged, an RV was displaced about 50 ft (15 m), and the roof of a garage was damaged. As the tornado continued eastward, six other homes sustained minor damage to roofs, siding, and windows. Numerous trees were blown down, blocking driveways and roadways. Several large limbs were snapped and fell onto a barn and a nearby home before the tornado weakened and dissipated.						
EF1	SW of Salem to S of Columbiana	Columbiana	OH	40.8861°N 80.9014°W	20:56–21:08	10.82 mi (17.41 km)	450 yd (410 m)
EF1	This tornado first snapped and damaged trees before tracking southeast. The tornado tore a metal roof off a business and lofted the debris into nearby properties and into trees. The tornado continued to damage trees and remove shingles from a home before dissipating.						
EF1	ESE of Diamond to S of Titusville	Venango	PA	41.5995°N 79.7631°W	21:08-21:14	4.34 mi (6.98 km)	200 yd (180 m)
EF1	This tornado damaged the roof of a home and numerous trees.						
EF1	E of Negley, OH	Columbiana (OH), Beaver (PA)	OH, PA	40.793°N 80.5239°W	21:24–21:26	0.78 mi (1.26 km)	140 yd (130 m)
EF1	This short-lived tornado downed trees and tore an awning off a garage as it tracked from Ohio into Pennsylvania. The tornado continued to uproot and damage trees before dissipating shortly after.						
EF1	S of Grand Valley	Warren	PA	41.6727°N 79.5458°W	21:27–21:28	0.64 mi (1.03 km)	150 yd (140 m)
EF1	Trees were snapped or uprooted.						
EF1	SW of West Liberty	Butler	PA	40.9897°N 80.1391°W	21:34-21:38	3.21 mi (5.17 km)	60 yd (55 m)
EF1	This tornado snapped large branches and a few trees near the trunk. Further along its path, an old barn roof was lofted and more trees lost large branches.						
EF0	W of Beaver Falls	Beaver	PA	40.7671°N 80.3523°W	21:36–21:38	0.73 mi (1.17 km)	200 yd (180 m)
EF0	This tornado damaged various trees and tore the siding off a home before it snapped the top of a pine tree off, which fell and crushed a garage. The tornado continued to damage trees before dissipating.						
EF1	S of West Liberty	Butler	PA	40.9828°N 80.0677°W	21:39-21:42	2.45 mi (3.94 km)	175 yd (160 m)
EF1	A large number of trees were uprooted or had large branches snapped.						
EF0	SE of West Liberty to SW of West Sunbury	Butler	PA	40.9783°N 80.0134°W	21:43–21:47	2.61 mi (4.20 km)	150 yd (140 m)
EF0	This high-end EF0 tornado snapped several large branches.						
EF0	S of Coudersport	Potter	PA	41.7343°N 78.007°W	23:15–23:16	0.01 mi (0.016 km)	15 yd (14 m)
EF0	A very brief spin-up tornado uprooted trees on the north side of PA 872.						
EF1	S of Pine Glen	Centre	PA	41.0779°N 78.0642°W	23:31–23:35	1.16 mi (1.87 km)	120 yd (110 m)
EF1	This tornado moved east-northeastward just south of Pine Glen and across PA 879. A home was partially unroofed, and trees were downed, including some that fell on utility wires.						
EF1	SSW of Kirkwood	Lancaster	PA	39.8365°N 76.1133°W	01:32–01:37	2.87 mi (4.62 km)	30 yd (27 m)
EF1	Trees and tree limbs were snapped and power poles were damaged.						

=== June 16 event ===
List of confirmed tornadoes – Tuesday, June 16, 2026
EF#	Location	County/Parish	State	Start coord.	Time (UTC)	Path length	Max. width
EFU	SE of Deacon	Cass	IN	40.6305°N 86.2915°W	22:53–22:54	0.26 mi (0.42 km)	50 yd (46 m)
EFU	Two storm chasers provided photos and videos of a brief tornado in an open field. No damage was noted.						
EFU	SE of Walton	Cass	IN	40.6408°N 86.2006°W	22:58–22:59	0.15 mi (0.24 km)	25 yd (23 m)
EFU	A brief tornado touched down and lifted vegetation in the air, but caused no damage.						
EF1	N of Cloverdale to S of Little Point	Putnam, Morgan	IN	39.5736°N 86.806°W	00:45–01:03	9.37 mi (15.08 km)	100 yd (91 m)
EF1	This tornado touched down near US 231. A mobile home was significantly damaged. A more concentrated area of tree damage was noted before the tornado damaged two homes and destroyed a barn. The tornado then moved through farm fields before lifting.						
EF0	Otsego Lake	Otsego	MI	44.9417°N 84.6997°W	00:49–00:54	2.6 mi (4.2 km)	20 yd (18 m)
EF0	A tornadic waterspout remained over Otsego Lake. Boats and lifts were flipped and scattered damage to trees and free standing objects occurred on the western shoreline of the lake.						

=== June 17 event ===
Events in Alabama were associated with Tropical Storm Arthur.

List of confirmed tornadoes – Wednesday, June 17, 2026
EF#	Location	County/Parish	State	Start coord.	Time (UTC)	Path length	Max. width
EF1	S of Pekin	Jefferson	IA	41.1578°N 92.1681°W	12:23–12:27	1.98 mi (3.19 km)	50 yd (46 m)
EF1	This tornado first impacted the Pekin Community High School, snapping a few softwood trees north of the football field and peeling portions of metal roofing off an outbuilding. The tornado then struck the softball field, blowing down a chain-link fence, damaging one of the dugouts, and depositing debris into the trees to the southeast. The tornado then moved through Linby, snapping tree limbs and uprooting another tree before dissipating.						
EF1	Monmouth	Warren	IL	40.9129°N 90.6484°W	13:25–13:27	1.29 mi (2.08 km)	100 yd (91 m)
EF1	This tornado, which was embedded within a much larger area of damaging straight-line winds, moved directly through Monmouth. Buildings in the town sustained shattered windows, roof damage, and damaged brick walls, and some homes suffered shingle loss. Dozens of trees were snapped, uprooted, or had large tree limbs snapped off, with some tree sections landing on homes.						
EF1	N of Alexandria, MO to northern Warsaw, IL	Lee (IA), Clark (MO), Hancock (IL)	IA, MO, IL	40.3766°N 91.4528°W	14:05–14:08	1.52 mi (2.45 km)	100 yd (91 m)
EF1	This tornado crossed through three states. Damage was mainly confined to trees, especially along the Mississippi River, where a concentrated area of snapped trees was noted. Two gas station canopies along US 61 in Missouri were also damaged.						
EFU	NNE of Ewell to SSW of Asbury	Dale	AL	31.4281°N 85.5712°W	18:28–18:43	5.33 mi (8.58 km)	25 yd (23 m)
EFU	This tornado was caught on film, but no damage was reported.						
EF0	Southwestern Enterprise	Coffee	AL	31.2964°N 85.8754°W	20:12–20:16	0.53 mi (0.85 km)	50 yd (46 m)
EF0	This tornado damaged the awning of Coppinville Junior High School and tossed some debris around the lawn. It then crossed a wooded area and snapped branches before lifting.						
EF1	Loyd to northern Springfield to W of Mechanicsburg	Menard, Sangamon	IL	39.9156°N 89.8526°W	21:19–21:38	30.35 mi (48.84 km)	150 yd (140 m)
EF1	This tornado first touched down in Menard County before moving east-southeastward into Sangamon County, initially causing minor tree damage. It then moved along IL 97 as it struck Salisbury, damaging trees along with the roof of a home and a garage. It then crossed the Sangamon River twice, continuing to damage trees before striking the northern part of Springfield, following the same track as another EF1 tornado that struck the same area exactly one week prior.						
EF2	Elon, IA to W of Boscobel, WI	Allamakee (IA), Crawford (WI)	IA, WI	43.277°N 91.371°W	21:53–22:37	32.77 mi (52.74 km)	320 yd (290 m)
EF2	This strong, long-track tornado touched down and moved east-southeast, producing a continuous path of tree damage while also damaging several farm outbuildings and a few residences. The tornado caused extensive tree damage before crossing the Mississippi River near Lock and Dam No. 9 and continuing into Wisconsin. Substantial tree damage occurred near WIS 35, followed by significant damage along WIS 27, where several power poles were downed. The tornado continued southeast, damaging additional trees and farm outbuildings before weakening and dissipating just northwest of WIS 60 near the Grant–Crawford county line.						
EF1	Southwestern Blue Mound to NE of Moweaqua	Christian, Macon, Shelby	IL	39.6985°N 89.1459°W	22:05–22:16	10.53 mi (16.95 km)	700 yd (640 m)
EF1	This tornado began in Christian County in the Griswold Conservation Area and caused extensive tree damage throughout the property. It then crossed into Macon County, damaging trees, the roof of an elementary school, and two grain bins in Blue Mound. The tornado tracked into Shelby County where it damaged more trees and electrical transmission lines before eventually dissipating.						
EF1	WSW of Bethany	Shelby, Moultrie	IL	39.624°N 88.8176°W	22:27–22:29	3.37 mi (5.42 km)	75 yd (69 m)
EF1	This tornado snapped several trees and large branches.						
EF1	SE of Boscobel to N of Edmund	Grant, Iowa	WI	43.1042°N 90.6361°W	22:45–23:14	20.81 mi (33.49 km)	150 yd (140 m)
EF1	This tornado touched down southeast of Boscobel and moved southeastward before turning east-southeastward, damaging trees and significantly damaging farm buildings.						
EF1	SW of Ridgeway to N of Middlebury	Iowa	WI	42.9919°N 90.0127°W	23:32–23:42	6.6 mi (10.6 km)	100 yd (91 m)
EF1	This tornado touched down and immediately crossed US 151, striking and damaging a salt shed on the east side of the highway. It continued southeast and completely destroyed a metal shed. The tornado sporadically caused tree damage before dissipating.						
EF2	N of Mattoon to northern Charleston	Coles	IL	39.5362°N 88.3794°W	23:42–23:59	13 mi (21 km)	800 yd (730 m)
EF2	This low-end EF2 tornado touched down north of Mattoon and strengthened as it moved southeastward, damaging trees, homes, and electrical transmission lines as it crossed US 45. The tornado then turned sharply east-southward, uprooting large hardwood trees and lifting the roof off a single-family residence, causing its garage to collapse. The tornado crossed I-57, where it flipped a semi-truck, injuring its driver. As it turned almost due eastward and approached Charleston, the tornado heavily damaged farm outbuildings and trees. It then moved through the northern part of Charleston, damaging structures at the fairgrounds, with additional damage to trees and outbuildings. The tornado then exited the city and dissipated just east of it.						
EF0	N of Divernon to Pawnee	Sangamon	IL	39.604°N 89.6694°W	23:48–23:55	5.66 mi (9.11 km)	200 yd (180 m)
EF0	This tornado touched down and moved eastward across I-55 before moving into Pawnee. Damage was mostly limited to trees, although minor damage to home soffits and roofs also occurred.						
EF1	Northern Belleville	Dane	WI	42.879°N 89.5441°W	00:10–00:15	2.73 mi (4.39 km)	300 yd (270 m)
EF1	Numerous trees were snapped or uprooted. Several homes sustained damage to shingles, siding, soffit, and gutters. A garage on one home fell in after its roof was lifted. A garage on another home was breached, causing the structure to fail and peel downwind, taking a large portion of the roof decking with it. The tornado continued east-southeast, damaging corn and a long water sprinkler. More tree damage was noted before lifting.						
EF0	S of Argyle	Lafayette	WI	42.6673°N 89.8713°W	00:16–00:17	1.23 mi (1.98 km)	50 yd (46 m)
EF0	A video showed a narrow tornado damaging or downing tree branches and limbs.						
EF3	Beecher City to northern Effingham to W of Rose Hill	Effingham, Jasper	IL	39.1904°N 88.7975°W	00:56–01:28	31.44 mi (50.60 km)	500 yd (460 m)
EF3	An intense tornado touched down in Beecher City along IL 33, initially producing low-end damage that included snapped and uprooted large trees and scattered damage to grain silos and farm outbuildings. As it moved east through areas just south of Shumway and crossed IL 33, it strengthened in intensity, snapping large trees, removing the roof from a home, and collapsing several farm outbuildings. The tornado reached peak intensity in the northern outskirts of Effingham, completely destroying a home while causing severe tree damage. Continuing along the northern side of Effingham, it demolished several large outbuildings, removed the roof and partially collapsed the exterior walls of another home, and after crossing US 45, destroyed a large metal building and threw a delivery van about 150 yd (140 m). The tornado broadened after leaving Effingham and crossed I-70, causing major tree damage and completely removing the roofs of multiple homes. Across northern and eastern Teutopolis, it destroyed several large barns and outbuildings and removed the roof of another residence near US 40. Farther east, the tornado continued to remain intense, destroying two homes, significantly damaging trees and outbuildings, and injuring two people. After entering Jasper County, it weakened but continued to damage homes, outbuildings, and trees, including heavily damaging the roof of a two-story home and rolling an SUV. The tornado gradually weakened farther southeast, producing additional tree and shingle damage and damaging an outbuilding and two grain bins before dissipating.						
EF1	E of Keller to SW of Saline City	Vigo, Clay	IN	39.3609°N 87.2812°W	01:07–01:17	6.64 mi (10.69 km)	300 yd (270 m)
EF1	The tornado touched down and damaged trees before causing its most significant damage to two homes, blowing their roofs completely away and destroying a garage.						
EF1	SW of Rose Hill	Jasper	IL	39.085°N 88.193°W	01:36–01:38	1.13 mi (1.82 km)	140 yd (130 m)
EF1	Several trees were snapped.						
EFU	SE of Rose Hill	Jasper	IL	39.08°N 88.11°W	01:41–01:43	1.75 mi (2.82 km)	50 yd (46 m)
EFU	A storm spotter and a storm chaser observed a tornado. No damage occurred.						
EF3	NNE of Spencer to S of Martinsville	Owen, Monroe	IN	39.3172°N 86.7428°W	01:44–02:07	18.49 mi (29.76 km)	880 yd (800 m)
EF3	This large, low-end EF3 tornado caused significant damage to homes and trees before crossing I-69 and moving into the Morgan-Monroe State Forest, causing widespread tree damage. Drone imagery showed evidence of intense tree damage on both sides of I-69 before the tornado dissipated. One person was injured.						
EF0	SSW of Grayslake	Lake	IL	42.3188°N 88.0671°W	02:32–02:33	0.24 mi (0.39 km)	125 yd (114 m)
EF0	This brief tornado touched down and caused sporadic tree and roof damage on the north side of a subdivision.						
EF1	NE of Christiansburg	Brown	IN	39.1099°N 86.148°W	02:43–02:45	1.37 mi (2.20 km)	100 yd (91 m)
EF1	A group of buildings suffered roof damage, with one of them having a steel frame door sheared off; a home was impacted, and trees suffered extensive damage.						

=== June 18 event ===
Events in Louisiana, Mississippi, Georgia, Alabama, and Florida were associated with Tropical Storm Arthur.

List of confirmed tornadoes – Thursday, June 18, 2026
EF#	Location	County/Parish	State	Start coord.	Time (UTC)	Path length	Max. width
EF1	WNW of Freetown to N of Acme	Jackson	IN	38.984°N 86.1774°W	04:03–04:14	6.35 mi (10.22 km)	325 yd (297 m)
EF1	This high-end EF1 tornado touched down and moved through the Hoosier National Forest, causing significant tree damage. Upon exiting the forest, it damaged several homes north of Freetown before eventually dissipating.						
EF2	ESE of Dillsboro, IN to N of Belleview, KY	Dearborn (IN), Ohio (IN), Boone (KY)	IN, KY	39.0055°N 84.9896°W	04:14–04:26	13.24 mi (21.31 km)	450 yd (410 m)
EF2	This strong, high-end EF2 tornado touched down and initially uprooteda large tree and downed several smaller trees before destroying an attached garage, damaging another garage, and dropping a large tree onto a house. It then strengthened considerably, completely destroying a house and two outbuildings and scattering debris across a large field. As the tornado continued east, it snapped numerous hardwood trees and produced significant tree damage while crossing into Ohio County, along with roof damage to several barns and outbuildings. Additional barn and large-tree damage occurred along SR 56, followed by numerous trees being knocked down at a campground near the Ohio River. The tornado crossed the Ohio River into Kentucky, where large tree branches were snapped before it rapidly weakened and dissipated near KY 20.						
EF1	Southern Oakbrook to southern Florence	Boone, Kenton	KY	38.9892°N 84.7018°W	04:34–04:46	6.18 mi (9.95 km)	400 yd (370 m)
EF1	A tornado began as it snapped several trees before moving east through residential areas, where it caused additional tree damage, minor fascia and roof damage, and snapped several larger hardwood trees. It continued uprooting and snapping trees before crossing I-71/I-75, where it partially removed the roof of one commercial building and damaged the roof of another. Near US 42, the tornado reached its peak intensity, snapping a large power pole and destroying a business sign. Farther east, numerous trees and large branches were downed in residential areas, including a large tree that fell onto a home and caused minor roof damage. The tornado continued southeast, snapping additional trees before weakening and dissipating with several large branches downed near the end of its path.						
EF2	SSE of Cedar Grove, IN to Drewersburg, IN to W of Alert, OH	Franklin (IN), Butler (OH)	IN, OH	39.3412°N 84.9296°W	05:22–05:33	7.6 mi (12.2 km)	400 yd (370 m)
EF2	This strong tornado struck Drewersburg, unroofing two homes, with one of them having multiple exterior walls collapse. Other homes suffered minor roof damage, and an outbuilding suffered heavy damage. Many tree limbs were snapped, and numerous trees were snapped or uprooted along the path as well, including one that fell on a home.						
EF0	E of Chauvin to Montegut	Terrebonne	LA	29.4397°N 90.5856°W	05:56–06:03	3.3 mi (5.3 km)	200 yd (180 m)
EF0	A weak tornado touched down near Bayou la Cache and tracked northeast toward Montegut, producing a well-defined swath of tree damage through largely inaccessible forest. The tornado then gradually weakened as it entered the southern part of Montegut, producing mainly minor tree damage before dissipating near Bayou Terrebonne.						
EF0	E of Lockport	Lafourche	LA	29.6203°N 90.4437°W	06:32–06:34	1.01 mi (1.63 km)	30 yd (27 m)
EF0	A tree was downed and a TDS was noted on private radar.						
EF0	ESE of Des Allemands	St. Charles	LA	29.7489°N 90.3691°W	06:51–07:00	3.69 mi (5.94 km)	50 yd (46 m)
EF0	This tornado remained over marshland as only damaged trees and vegetation.						
EF2	Northeastern Austin, IN to southern Milton, KY	Scott (IN), Jefferson (IN), Trimble (KY)	IN, KY	38.7527°N 85.8006°W	07:04–07:32	23.05 mi (37.10 km)	1,000 yd (910 m)
EF2	This strong tornado touched down on the northeast side of Austin, damaging numerous trees and causing fencing and bleacher damage at a community park before continuing through rural areas just north of SR 256. It then strengthened, producing extensive tree damage and damaging several homes before entering Jefferson County. The tornado then grew larger and strengthened further in intensity, completely destroying several barns and some residences while causing extensive tree damage. It continued toward SR 56 and reached its peak intensity at the Clifty Creek Power Plant, where a steel electrical transmission structure was toppled and mangled and power lines fell into the Ohio River, forcing river traffic at Madison to close. After crossing the Ohio River into Kentucky, the tornado weakened but caused extensive damage to trees and campers near Milton before dissipating along US 421. At least one person was injured and six cattle were killed.						
EF0	WSW of Theriot	Terrebonne	LA	29.3811°N 90.977°W	07:08–07:10	1.05 mi (1.69 km)	100 yd (91 m)
EF0	Vegetation across marshland was damaged, including trees.						
EF1	N of Carrollton, KY to W of Sanders, KY	Switzerland (IN), Carroll (KY)	IN, KY	38.7049°N 85.1592°W	07:45–07:56	9.71 mi (15.63 km)	750 yd (690 m)
EF1	This tornado touched down just north of the Ohio River in Indiana, snapping or uprooting numerous trees. Two nearby homes also had significant portions of their roofs removed and their porches damaged. The tornado then crossed the Ohio River into Kentucky, damaging several more residences. The tornado continued to snap or down trees and power poles before eventually lifting.						
EF1	S of Houma	Terrebonne	LA	29.5299°N 90.74°W	08:00–08:06	2.27 mi (3.65 km)	75 yd (69 m)
EF1	A tornado touched down over inaccessible marsh and forest, producing intermittent minor to moderate tree damage as it tracked northeast. The tornado became more damaging as it emerged from the inaccessible area, where trees were more noticeably displaced and two homes sustained significant roof loss and the collapse of at least one exterior wall each. It then continued northeast into another area of marsh and forest, producing additional minor vegetation damage before its damage path could no longer be conclusively identified.						
EF2	WSW of Arkoe to W of Jasper	Pike	OH	39.0283°N 83.2876°W	08:05–08:20	8.59 mi (13.82 km)	250 yd (230 m)
EF2	A strong tornado initially produced weak damage as it moved through heavily forested areas, breaking branches and snapping and uprooting mature trees before crossing Appalachian Highway and causing additional tree damage near a rest area. It strengthened considerably while crossing a forested ridge west of Elm Grove, where a 200–250 yd (180–230 m) wide section of hardwood forest was completely blown down, with all trees snapped and none left standing. As the tornado entered Elm Grove, it weakened somewhat but still collapsed barns and outbuildings, removed a significant portion of a home's roof, and snapped large electrical transmission lines. The tornado then turned southeast, causing additional damage near SR 772 and Appalachian Highway before producing its final observed tree damage and dissipating.						
EF1	Eastern Houma	Terrebonne	LA	29.5772°N 90.6882°W	08:11–08:14	0.98 mi (1.58 km)	40 yd (37 m)
EF1	This tornado damaged several businesses in a shopping center, shattering nearly all of their windows, partially collapsing interior walls and roofing, and throwing rooftop HVAC equipment to the ground. Four homes sustained partial to significant roof loss, including one that also suffered the collapse of an exterior wall, while several carports were significantly damaged.						
EF1	SW of Dry Ridge to NNE of Williamstown	Grant	KY	38.6515°N 84.6613°W	08:18–08:22	6.38 mi (10.27 km)	150 yd (140 m)
EF1	This tornado initially uprooted and snapped several trees before continuing east, where additional hardwood trees were damaged and a barn was completely destroyed. Farther along the path, another barn had its walls collapse and roof blown off, while a separate outbuilding lost its sheet-metal roof and portions of its siding, with debris thrown about 50 yd (46 m). Extensive tree damage continued toward I-75, followed by additional tree and power-pole damage after the tornado crossed the interstate. The most concentrated damage occurred east of U.S. Route 25, where numerous large, healthy trees were snapped or uprooted and wooden power poles were broken. Near the end of the path, the tornado reached its peak strength and heavily damaged a multi-car garage, removing most of its roof and collapsing significant portions of its cinder-block exterior walls. Minor tree damage continued briefly before the tornado dissipated.						
EF0	W of Cynthiana	Harrison	KY	38.3972°N 84.3519°W	08:33–08:34	0.62 mi (1.00 km)	80 yd (73 m)
EF0	A brief but high-end EF0 tornado touched down within a broader area of straight-line wind damage, initially causing tree damage and damaging the roof of a metal barn. It continued east, producing additional tree damage and scattering roofing material from the barn before reaching KY 356, where another metal barn sustained roof and side-panel damage, a home suffered roof and fascia damage, and a large softwood tree was uprooted. The tornado then turned sharply north and dissipated shortly afterward.						
EF0	S of Houma	Terrebonne	LA	29.5415°N 90.7452°W	08:43–08:46	1.48 mi (2.38 km)	80 yd (73 m)
EF0	This tornado remained over marshland, damaging only trees and vegetation.						
EF1	Eastern Houma (1st tornado)	Terrebonne	LA	29.5842°N 90.6894°W	08:50–08:51	0.24 mi (0.39 km)	50 yd (46 m)
EF1	A tornado tossed a truck about 30 ft (9.1 m), causing significant damage, while snapping and uprooting multiple trees. Several homes sustained partial roof loss, and one home had its carport collapse.						
EF0	Eastern Houma (2nd tornado)	Terrebonne	LA	29.5738°N 90.6847°W	08:50–08:51	0.07 mi (0.11 km)	80 yd (73 m)
EF0	A very brief tornado damaged several trees, homes, and wooden power poles.						
EF0	ENE of Houma	Terrebonne, Lafourche	LA	29.606°N 90.6626°W	08:56–08:59	1.01 mi (1.63 km)	100 yd (91 m)
EF0	This tornado initially damaged a few trees and homes before moving over inaccessible marshland, causing further damage to vegetation before lifting.						
EF2	Southwestern Maysville	Mason	KY	38.6235°N 83.8109°W	09:02–09:09	1.97 mi (3.17 km)	150 yd (140 m)
EF2	This strong tornado began by snapping several hardwood trees before crossing the southern portion of the Maysville Community and Technical College campus, where a wind gust of 114 mph (183 km/h) wind gust was measured at a Kentucky Mesonet site. It then moved across open fields and struck several businesses along KY 9, causing roof and structural damage. The tornado rapidly intensified farther east, severely damaging several residences, demolishing an outbuilding and throwing debris and heavy objects 100–200 ft (30–61 m), including a 690 lb (310 kg) four-wheeler and a large cinder block. A dual-axle trailer was pushed nearly 100 ft (30 m), while another property sustained extensive roof and siding damage, snapped and uprooted hardwood trees, and fencing pulled from the ground toward the circulation. The tornado turned northeast, causing additional tree and fence damage, while outflow winds on its southern side heavily damaged two large barns and completely removed their roofs. A metal outbuilding was also pulled down a hill before the tornado dissipated.						
EF0	E of Des Allemands to W of Luling	St. Charles	LA	29.817°N 90.4129°W	09:43–09:54	6.63 mi (10.67 km)	75 yd (69 m)
EF0	This tornado remained over marshland and caused damage to trees.						
EF1	W of Lacombe	St. Tammany	LA	30.3205°N 90.0179°W	09:59–10:02	1.84 mi (2.96 km)	150 yd (140 m)
EF1	A tornado touched down near the shore of Lake Pontchartrain or moved ashore as a tornadic waterspout, initially damaging marsh vegetation and trees. It reached peak intensity farther northeast, where several trees were snapped or uprooted and a shed was damaged. Additional trees were uprooted and partially snapped as the tornado continued northeast before it began weakening near US 190. Only minor tree damage occurred north of US 190 before the tornado dissipated.						
EF0	N of Destrehan	St. Charles	LA	29.9597°N 90.3579°W	10:01–10:04	0.92 mi (1.48 km)	100 yd (91 m)
EF0	A brief tornado caused minor tree damage on both sides of I-310.						
EF1	SSE of Boutte to Avondale	St. Charles, Jefferson	LA	29.8172°N 90.3317°W	10:11–10:34	10.12 mi (16.29 km)	300 yd (270 m)
EF1	This tornado began over the Salvador Wildlife Management Area, initially damaging marsh vegetation before broadening and causing scattered tree damage across inaccessible areas. The tornado strengthened near Bayou Verret, where numerous damaged or displaced trees were noted on satellite imagery. It weakened before reaching US 90, crossing the highway and producing minor home and tree damage in Waggaman and Avondale. The tornado then restrengthened, rolling a single-wide manufactured home into another residence and severely bending its frame, resulting in two injuries. Additional homes were damaged as the tornado weakened before dissipating near a cemetery.						
EF1	Eastern Jefferson to northern New Orleans	Jefferson, Orleans	LA	29.9622°N 90.1446°W	10:44–10:59	7.93 mi (12.76 km)	225 yd (206 m)
EF1	A tornado touched down on the east bank of the Mississippi River, snapping and uprooting trees, breaking power poles, and derailing empty railcars near Jefferson Highway and Airline Highway. It continued northeast into New Orleans toward the University of New Orleans, producing primarily tree damage along with minor damage to buildings before dissipating.						
EF0	Eden Isles	St. Tammany	LA	30.228°N 89.8032°W	11:49–11:55	3.13 mi (5.04 km)	350 yd (320 m)
EF0	This weak tornado touched down in Eden Isles, producing widespread tree debris and downed branches along with minor damage to several homes, including one that sustained a garage failure. The tornado continued east and damaged several businesses as it crossed I-10, followed by additional home and tree damage in Lakeshore Village where the tornado ended.						
EF1	SE of Eden Isles, LA to N of Pearlington, MS	St. Tammany (LA), Hancock (MS)	LA, MS	30.1845°N 89.7564°W	11:50–12:15	12.07 mi (19.42 km)	300 yd (270 m)
EF1	This tornado began on the northeastern shores of Lake Pontchartrain, where a large boat was flipped on its side. As the tornado tracked northeast, additional visible damage to homes and the lofting of outdoor fixtures was noted. The tornado continued northeast removed shingles off of homes, snapped a few trees, collapsed garages, and blew out a wall or two on two different homes. The tornado then crossed inaccessible marsh areas to another neighborhood where it slightly damaged trees and metal roofs. The tornado then moved through the US 190 corridor, where numerous trees were uprooted or snapped. Several outbuildings were damaged and tension cables on a cell tower were snapped. A manufactured home had most of its roof removed and was shifted significantly off its foundation. The tornado then moved into the Pearl River Basin and strengthened over forested and marshland areas before lifting after exiting the Pearl River Wildlife Management Area.						
EF0	W of Saucier	Harrison	MS	30.6314°N 89.24°W	12:21–12:22	0.5 mi (0.80 km)	125 yd (114 m)
EF0	Trees were damaged by this weak tornado.						
EF1	N of Diamondhead to NNW of Lizana	Hancock, Harrison	MS	30.5055°N 89.3564°W	13:02–13:16	7.37 mi (11.86 km)	275 yd (251 m)
EF1	Widespread tree damage was noted and several properties had minor damage inflicted.						
EF1	ESE of Wiggins	Stone	MS	30.817°N 89.0961°W	13:10–13:18	4.28 mi (6.89 km)	250 yd (230 m)
EF1	This high-end EF1 tornado tore down numerous trees along its path. The tornado also unroofed and partially tore off a wall from a mobile home and inflicted minor roof damage to a home and outbuildings.						
EF1	ENE of Wiggins	Stone	MS	30.891°N 89.0023°W	13:24–13:26	0.96 mi (1.54 km)	210 yd (190 m)
EF1	Another short-lived high-end EF1 tornado touched down minutes after the previous one, snapping or uprooting numerous trees in a forested area.						
EF1	NE of McHenry	Stone	MS	30.7278°N 89.116°W	13:45–13:47	0.49 mi (0.79 km)	40 yd (37 m)
EF1	This tornado inflicted tree damage and moderate structural damage.						
EF1	ESE of Leaf	Greene	MS	31.02°N 88.76°W	13:52–13:53	0.26 mi (0.42 km)	60 yd (55 m)
EF1	Several trees were downed.						
EF0	ESE of Avera	Greene	MS	31.28°N 88.7°W	14:04–14:09	2.29 mi (3.69 km)	90 yd (82 m)
EF0	This tornado primarily damaged the tops of trees but it also uprooted a tree occasionally.						
EF1	Rock Stream to S of Hector	Yates, Schuyler	NY	42.4678°N 76.9309°W	14:46–14:57	3.48 mi (5.60 km)	150 yd (140 m)
EF1	This tornado struck Rock Stream as it crossed NY 14, inflicting roof and siding damage to a residence, collapsing a garage outbuilding, scattering shingles up to a quarter mile away, and uprooting trees. The tornado also snapped 40 vineyard posts while spearing twigs and branches into the vineyard. The tornado then crossed Seneca Lake and moved into Schuyler County, downing several large trees and large branches, including one branch that impaled a house, before quickly dissipating.						
EF0	W of Cortland	Cortland	NY	42.5901°N 76.2445°W	15:32–15:34	1.89 mi (3.04 km)	200 yd (180 m)
EF0	This tornado damaged, snapped, and uprooted trees as it moved along NY 222.						
EF1	W of Lincoln	Addison	VT	44.1014°N 73.0156°W	17:31–17:33	0.31 mi (0.50 km)	200 yd (180 m)
EF1	Trees were snapped or uprooted.						
EF1	NE of Bridgewater	Windsor	VT	43.5928°N 72.6089°W	18:35–18:38	1.27 mi (2.04 km)	550 yd (500 m)
EF1	This tornado moved along US 4. Two residences suffered roof damage, warped solar panels, and a metal shed. Numerous trees were snapped or uprooted, including one that fell on and collapsed a wooden structure.						
EF1	SE of Midland to NE of Upatoi	Muscogee	GA	32.5437°N 84.7884°W	22:37–22:43	4.50 mi (7.24 km)	150 yd (140 m)
EF1	This tornado snapped and uprooted trees and downed powerlines. One tree fell onto a home.						
EF0	SE of La Crosse	Schley	GA	32.1809°N 84.2669°W	23:44–23:47	1.84 mi (2.96 km)	100 yd (91 m)
EF0	Numerous trees were uprooted or snapped.						
EF1	SSE of Musella to SW of Bolingbroke	Crawford, Monroe	GA	32.7798°N 84.0244°W	23:50–00:06	13.37 mi (21.52 km)	175 yd (160 m)
EF1	Trees were snapped or uprooted. The tornado intensified quickly as it traveled east-northeast where more trees were snapped or uprooted. The tornado moved into a wooded area, snapping dozens to hundreds of trees. Several homes sustained moderate to severe damage as a result of trees falling onto them. It continued east-northeast into another wooded area before lifting.						
EF1	W of Mobile	Mobile	AL	30.7281°N 88.1854°W	23:55–23:59	2.32 mi (3.73 km)	40 yd (37 m)
EF1	This tornado debranched or uprooted trees.						
EF0	Bolingbroke	Monroe	GA	32.9075°N 83.8252°W	00:14–00:18	3.37 mi (5.42 km)	125 yd (114 m)
EF0	Trees were snapped or uprooted.						
EF0	NNW of Hurricane	Baldwin	AL	30.8829°N 87.9388°W	00:14–00:19	2.53 mi (4.07 km)	30 yd (27 m)
EF0	Tree damage by this tornado was observed on satellite imagery.						
EF1	N of Crossroads (1st tornado)	Baldwin	AL	30.8762°N 87.8634°W	00:18–00:21	1.22 mi (1.96 km)	100 yd (91 m)
EF1	This tornado snapped or uprooted several trees.						
EF1	N of Spanish Fort	Baldwin	AL	30.7016°N 87.8995°W	00:18–00:19	0.35 mi (0.56 km)	90 yd (82 m)
EF1	This tornado debranched or uprooted multiple trees.						
EF0	N of Crossroads (2nd tornado)	Baldwin	AL	30.86°N 87.87°W	00:19–00:23	1.35 mi (2.17 km)	100 yd (91 m)
EF0	A weak tornado caused tree damage that was noted on high-resolution satellite imagery.						
EF0	S of Dames Ferry to WSW of Wayside	Monroe, Jones	GA	32.9748°N 83.7434°W	00:25–00:37	9.08 mi (14.61 km)	125 yd (114 m)
EF0	Numerous trees were snapped or uprooted.						
EF1	E of Stapleton	Baldwin	AL	30.72°N 87.71°W	00:32–00:34	2.2 mi (3.5 km)	80 yd (73 m)
EF1	This tornado tracked through forests, causing damage to trees.						
EF1	N of Gateswood, AL	Baldwin (AL), Escambia (FL)	AL, FL	30.74°N 87.67°W	00:35–00:45	8.23 mi (13.24 km)	400 yd (370 m)
EF1	This tornado developed and produced scattered tree damage along a persistent path before strengthening considerably, where nearly all widely spaced trees across open fields were knocked down within a wide swath. The tornado gradually weakened and narrowed, with tree damage becoming intermittent as it continued toward the Alabama-Florida state line. After crossing the Perdido River, the tornado quickly dissipated.						
EF1	Wayside	Jones	GA	33.0469°N 83.6039°W	00:37–00:41	2.3 mi (3.7 km)	150 yd (140 m)
EF1	Several trees were snapped or uprooted. One home sustained damage from a tree.						
EF0	NW of Gateswood	Baldwin	AL	30.79°N 87.65°W	00:37–00:38	0.19 mi (0.31 km)	30 yd (27 m)
EF0	A brief tornado caused minor tree damage.						
EF0	N of Bradley	Jones	GA	33.0862°N 83.5573°W	00:41–00:44	1.41 mi (2.27 km)	100 yd (91 m)
EF0	Several trees were snapped or uprooted.						
EF1	WSW of Blountsville to E of Resseaus Crossroads	Jones, Baldwin, Putnam	GA	33.114°N 83.5194°W	00:51–01:00	10.14 mi (16.32 km)	175 yd (160 m)
EF1	Numerous trees were snapped or uprooted. A couple of homes sustained damage from falling trees along the lake.						
EF0	Flat Rock	Putnam	GA	33.2218°N 83.3351°W	01:04–01:07	2.59 mi (4.17 km)	100 yd (91 m)
EF0	Numerous trees were snapped or uprooted. There were indirectly two injuries and two fatalities the morning after the tornado as a result of a tree falling on a vehicle. It is likely but not certain that the tree was weakened by the tornado. Final determination will be that these were indirect injuries and fatalities from the tornado/storm itself.						
EF0	ENE of Rockville to SSW of Liberty	Putnam, Greene	GA	33.3349°N 83.1774°W	01:19–01:24	4.40 mi (7.08 km)	125 yd (114 m)
EF0	Several trees were snapped or uprooted. The tornado then traveled north before emerging onto Lake Oconee and damaged homes along the shoreline, with trees falling onto several of them. A boat and boathouse was flipped and partially sunk and numerous powerlines were downed.						
EF0	N of Red Head to SSW of New Hope	Washington	FL	30.5363°N 85.85°W	03:25–03:30	1.84 mi (2.96 km)	50 yd (46 m)
EF0	A weak tornado downed multiple small tree limbs.						

=== June 19 event ===
Event in Louisiana was associated with Tropical Storm Arthur.

List of confirmed tornadoes – Friday, June 19, 2026
EF#	Location	County/Parish	State	Start coord.	Time (UTC)	Path length	Max. width
EFU	NE of Lake George	Hubbard	MN	47.25°N 94.94°W	19:26	0.28 mi (0.45 km)	
EFU	A brief tornado was observed by a storm chaser within Paul Bunyan State Forest. Some leaves were stripped and lofted off of trees.						
EF0	WSW of Laporte	Hubbard	MN	47.21°N 94.83°W	19:46–19:53	2.78 mi (4.47 km)	50 yd (46 m)
EF0	This weak tornado kicked up dust, leaves and other small debris but caused no damage.						
EF0	Arabi	St. Bernard	LA	29.9631°N 89.9914°W	22:51–22:56	0.7 mi (1.1 km)	75 yd (69 m)
EF0	This high-end EF0 tornado tracked through Arabi, primarily removing shingles from homes, damaging fences, and downing large tree branches. Three homes sustained more substantial roof loss, although two had older roofs and the third was an abandoned structure with significant termite and rot damage. One of the roof failures occurred where an attached carport connected to the home, while well-built homes along the path generally sustained only minor damage.						
EF0	Western Osseo	Trempealeau	WI	44.5817°N 91.2437°W	23:48–23:50	0.93 mi (1.50 km)	30 yd (27 m)
EF0	The brief tornado touched down near US 10 in Osseo, where it destroyed a storage garage and damaged trees. It continued through a narrow path, damaging a couple of sheds, additional trees, and a power pole before dissipating shortly afterward.						
EFU	ESE of Merrillan	Jackson	WI	44.4403°N 90.8071°W	00:45–00:47	0.24 mi (0.39 km)	30 yd (27 m)
EFU	A photo showed a faint lofting of dust with surface circulation.						

=== June 20 event ===
List of confirmed tornadoes – Saturday, June 20, 2026
EF#	Location	County/Parish	State	Start coord.	Time (UTC)	Path length	Max. width
EFU	E of McFaddin	Calhoun	TX	28.53°N 96.89°W	15:58	0.01 mi (0.016 km)	1 yd (0.91 m)
EFU	A tropical funnel very briefly touched down and caused no damage just west of Green Lake.						
EF0	NE of Marbleton	Sublette	WY	42.6319°N 109.9843°W	17:51–17:54	0.62 mi (1.00 km)	30 yd (27 m)
EF0	This landspout remained over open country. No damage occurred						
EFU	E of Atwood	Rawlins	KS	39.8005°N 100.9008°W	22:11–22:35	2.63 mi (4.23 km)	100 yd (91 m)
EFU	A tornado was reported by multiple storm chasers. No damage was found.						

=== June 21 event ===
List of confirmed tornadoes – Sunday, June 21, 2026
EF#	Location	County / Parish	State	Start Coord.	Time (UTC)	Path length	Max width
EF2	E of Sedgwick	Sedgwick, Harvey	KS		06:14–06:16	0.11 mi (0.18 km)	50 yd (46 m)
EF2	1 death — This narrow, brief, but strong high-end EF2 tornado blew away a double-wide manufactured home that was bolted to a poured basement foundation, where one person was killed. Nearby, metal roofing was peeled from an outbuilding that also had part of its gutter ripped off and sustained damage to its rafters, and an unanchored outbuilding sandwiched between two cars was obliterated, with the cars suffering minor damage from flying debris. Additonally, another person was injured. Debris from the home and the two outbuildings was found blown to the northeast up to 6 mi (9.7 km) away.						
EF0	Warson Woods	St. Louis	MO		19:21–19:22	0.88 mi (1.42 km)	10 yd (9.1 m)
EF0	The tornado inflicted minor tree damage.						
EF0	SSW of Stewardson	Shelby	IL		20:22–20:24	1.29 mi (2.08 km)	150 yd (140 m)
EF0	Trees and a farm outbuilding were damaged.						
EF1	Louisville	Clay	IL		20:30–20:39	4.27 mi (6.87 km)	200 yd (180 m)
EF1	This tornado began south of Louisville and moved northward into the south side of town, removing a large portion of the roof of a business storage building and an attached residence. The tornado weakened slightly as it moved through the town before exiting and re-intensifying northeast of it, where it snapped off power poles and large trees. It then damaged a few more trees before dissipating.						
EFU	W of South Pekin	Tazewell	IL		20:35–20:36	0.19 mi (0.31 km)	20 yd (18 m)
EFU	A landspout was recorded. No damage occurred.						
EF1	ESE of Neoga	Cumberland	IL		20:43–20:44	0.85 mi (1.37 km)	75 yd (69 m)
EF1	A few farm outbuildings and trees were damaged.						
EF0	N of Vernon	Fayette, Marion	IL		20:49–20:52	1.2 mi (1.9 km)	10 yd (9.1 m)
EF0	A storm chaser photographed this tornado as it moved southeastward across US 51 in front of a tree line, where minor tree damage was noted.						
EF0	SE of Bradbury to W of Diona	Cumberland, Coles	IL		21:06–21:17	5.89 mi (9.48 km)	150 yd (140 m)
EF0	This tornado tracked northeast, damaging a few farm outbuildings and trees. It then turned east-northeastward and caused more tree damage before lifting.						
EF2	S of Newton	Jasper	IL		21:07–21:14	3.61 mi (5.81 km)	250 yd (230 m)
EF2	This tornado touched down, quickly intensifying as an outbuilding was destroyed. Afterwards, the tornado weakened, snapping and delimbing trees. The tornado crossed IL 130, snapping numerous trees along the highway. The tornado reached its peak intensity shortly thereafter, debarking softwood trees, destroying a block outbuilding, snapping and delimbing multiple other trees, and leaving power poles leaning.						
EF2	E of Newton to W of Willow Hill	Jasper	IL		21:15–21:18	2.6 mi (4.2 km)	300 yd (270 m)
EF2	Immediately after the dissipation of the first tornado, the parent supercell quickly produced another significant tornado east of Newton. The tornado snapped and uprooted numerous trees, along with snapping power poles and damaging or destroying a couple of outbuildings. The tornado intensified to low-end EF2 intensity, snapping numerous trees in forests south of the Embarras River. The tornado primarily caused moderate tree damage before dissipating.						
EFU	S of Kinmundy	Marion	IL		21:22–21:25	1.32 mi (2.12 km)	
EFU	This tornado had no recorded damage.						
EF1	SE of Farina	Marion	IL		21:31–21:36	2.13 mi (3.43 km)	190 yd (170 m)
EF1	This high-end EF1 tornado snapped multiple trees and unroofed an outbuilding.						
EF1	S of Annapolis	Crawford	IL		21:36–21:49	6.62 mi (10.65 km)	600 yd (550 m)
EF1	Trees and electrical transmission lines were damaged.						
EF1	SSE of Annapolis	Crawford	IL		21:41–21:44	2 mi (3.2 km)	600 yd (550 m)
EF1	This tornado snapped or uprooted multiple trees.						
EF3	SSE of Dix to NNW of Keenes	Jefferson, Wayne	IL		22:02–22:30	15.26 mi (24.56 km)	400 yd (370 m)
EF3	2 deaths – See section on this tornado – Five people were injured.						
EFU	N of Brewster	Thomas	KS		22:12–22:14	0.87 mi (1.40 km)	50 yd (46 m)
EFU	A TDS was noted on radar but not damaged was found.						
EF1	N of Wilfred to Western Hymera	Sullivan	IN		22:22–22:27	2.74 mi (4.41 km)	425 yd (389 m)
EF1	The tornado ripped off part of the roof of a barn before causing extensive damage to a grove of trees and three additional structures.						
EF1	W of Birds to SSE of Flat Rock	Lawrence, Crawford	IL		22:25–22:35	4.25 mi (6.84 km)	300 yd (270 m)
EF1	This tornado snapped or uprooted numerous trees.						
EF0	S of Shobonier	Fayette	IL		22:27–22:31	3.41 mi (5.49 km)	25 yd (23 m)
EF0	A tornado was recorded by local broadcast media. A few tree branches were downed.						
EF1	NNE of Sims to WSW of Jeffersonville	Wayne	IL		22:47–22:51	1.53 mi (2.46 km)	75 yd (69 m)
EF1	This tornado touched down and damaged a shipping container, a shed, and a barn, as well as uprooting numerous trees along its path. The tornado then lifted moments later.						
EF1	SE of Claremont to SW of Sumner	Richland, Lawrence	IL		22:53–23:01	3.19 mi (5.13 km)	300 yd (270 m)
EF1	Numerous trees had their branches broken or were snapped or uprooted.						
EF0	S of Patricksburg	Owen	IN		22:56–22:59	0.92 mi (1.48 km)	25 yd (23 m)
EF0	This brief tornado caused sporadic tree damage, mostly to large tree limbs and small tree trunks.						
EF0	W of Bicknell	Knox	IN		23:00–23:02	0.3 mi (0.48 km)	80 yd (73 m)
EF0	Drone footage shows some large tree limbs knocked down and metal roof panels of an outbuilding missing or pulled up. The most serious damage was observed closer to a main road, where tree limbs of several hardwood trees were destroyed, and the roof of an outbuilding was removed.						
EF0	NNE of Golden Gate	Wayne	IL		23:37-23:38	0.52 mi (0.84 km)	75 yd (69 m)
EF0	This tornado broke off branches from trees and flattened some corn.						
EF0	WSW of Dover Hill to N of Shoals	Martin	IN		23:58–00:04	2.02 mi (3.25 km)	50 yd (46 m)
EF0	A weak tornado developed southwest of Dover Hill before moving southeastward, where a metal barn roof was torn off, and convergence was noted in nearby snapped tree damage.						
EF2	N of Cynthiana to WSW of Francisco	Gibson	IN		00:02–00:25	11.52 mi (18.54 km)	300 yd (270 m)
EF2	An EF2 tornado was confirmed by NWS Paducah. Preliminary information.						
EF1	E of Jeffersonville	Wayne	IL		00:11–00:21	3.78 mi (6.08 km)	50 yd (46 m)
EF1	A carport was lofted over a barn at one residence and another residence sustained damage from a tree falling on it. Corn was also flattened.						
EF0	SSE of Taylorsville	Bartholomew	IN		00:12–00:17	0.49 mi (0.79 km)	85 yd (78 m)
EF0	The tornado touched down east of US 31 and moved northeast through a tree line and corn field. A convergent wind pattern was noted within the cornfield. Large trees were also uprooted or snapped before the tornado lifted.						
EFU	WSW of Edinburg	Christian	IL		00:27–00:28	0.05 mi (0.080 km)	20 yd (18 m)
EFU	This very brief tornado caused no damage.						
EF1	E of Mackey	Gibson	IN		00:38–00:41	1.25 mi (2.01 km)	25 yd (23 m)
EF1	The tornado touched down east of Mackey, snapping and delimbing trees and partially damaging the roof of a mobile home.						
EF1	NE of Lynnville (1st tornado)	Warrick	IN		00:47–00:50	0.96 mi (1.54 km)	
EF1	This tornado removed branches from trees and caused power poles to lean.						
EF0	NE of Lynnville (2nd tornado)	Warrick	IN		00:52–00:53	0.35 mi (0.56 km)	
EF0	This tornado uprooted or removed limbs from trees.						
EF0	W of Selvin	Warrick	IN		00:57–00:59	0.98 mi (1.58 km)	25 yd (23 m)
EF0	This tornado uprooted several trees.						
EF0	ESE of Eminence to NE of Winona	Shannon	MO		01:00–01:03	2.7 mi (4.3 km)	200 yd (180 m)
EF0	This tornado snapped or toppled several trees and blew down doors to an outbuilding.						
EFU	SW of Tower Hill	Shelby	IL		01:07–01:08	0.11 mi (0.18 km)	20 yd (18 m)
EFU	A trained spotter reported a brief tornado that caused no damage.						
EF1	NW of Dale	Spencer	IN		01:15–01:16	0.29 mi (0.47 km)	125 yd (114 m)
EF1	This very brief tornado damaged several turkey barns, caused shingle damage to a home, and uprooted several trees.						
EF1	N of Charlestown	Clark	IN		01:50–01:58	3.05 mi (4.91 km)	150 yd (140 m)
EF1	A tornado initially damaged trees and a home before strengthening, uprooting roughly 10 trees within a small area. It then quickly weakened and dissipated just east of SR 3.						
EFU	NE of Enfield	White	IL		01:53–01:54	0.21 mi (0.34 km)	25 yd (23 m)
EFU	This very brief tornado caused no damage.						
EF1	NNW of Newburgh	Warrick	IN		02:15–02:20	2.95 mi (4.75 km)	75 yd (69 m)
EF1	This tornado touched down north of the Deaconess Gateway Hospital, snapping trees at mid-range EF1 intensity. The tornado then impacted several apartment buildings, causing minimal siding damage. A couple more apartment buildings were impacted afterwards, causing minimal damage. Portions of roofing and HVAC units from a Ruler Foods building were ripped away, and a flagpole was bent. The tornado dissipated shortly afterwards. Two injuries were recorded.						
EF0	N of Brandenburg	Harrison	IN		02:53–02:54	0.85 mi (1.37 km)	100 yd (91 m)
EF0	This tornado ripped off the doors to an outbuilding and damaged another one nearby. Multiple trees were also debranched or uprooted.						
EF0	Grandview	Spencer	IN		03:03–03:04	1.03 mi (1.66 km)	25 yd (23 m)
EF0	This brief tornado inflicted light shingle damage to the home and debranched or uprooted a few trees.						
EF1	NW of Chandler	Warrick	IN		03:37–03:38	0.51 mi (0.82 km)	50 yd (46 m)
EF1	This short-lived tornado snapped and uprooted several trees and partially removed the roof of an outbuilding.						
EF1	N of Chandler	Warrick	IN		03:39–03:46	2.46 mi (3.96 km)	150 yd (140 m)
EF1	Another tornado touched down in the Chandler area, snapping power poles and dozens of trees at high-end EF1 intensity. Minor roof damage to a home was also noted.						
EF0	Mystic	Breckinridge	KY		04:07–04:10	0.92 mi (1.48 km)	50 yd (46 m)
EF0	The brief, likely intermittent tornado directly struck an unoccupied mobile home, flipping it over and damaging its roof. It then moved down a bluff, causing minor tree damage before strengthening slightly and snapping a tree onto a home. The tornado quickly dissipated shortly afterward.						
EF1	W of Webster	Breckinridge	KY		04:14–04:17	1.15 mi (1.85 km)	70 yd (64 m)
EF1	A brief tornado quickly intensified as it moved east, destroying a shed by completely removing its roof and most of its walls. Several nearby trees were also snapped at their bases before the tornado quickly dissipated.						
EF0	Hawesville to SE of Cannelton, IN	Hancock	KY		04:44–04:54	3.49 mi (5.62 km)	100 yd (91 m)
EF0	This tornado began in eastern Hawesville near US 60 and tracked east, closely following the Ohio River and possibly moving briefly over the water before returning to shore. Damage along the path consisted primarily of downed and damaged trees.						

=== June 22 event ===
List of confirmed tornadoes – Monday, June 22, 2026
EF#	Location	County / Parish	State	Start Coord.	Time (UTC)	Path length	Max width
EF2	Western El Reno	Canadian	OK		06:30–06:34	2 mi (3.2 km)	180 yd (160 m)
EF2	This strong tornado initially developed northwest of El Reno and moved southeast, breaking a utility pole before entering a neighborhood. At least two homes lost most of their roofs and sustained partial garage collapses, while numerous other homes suffered varying degrees of roof damage. Trees and fences were also damaged throughout the neighborhood before the tornado dissipated prior to reaching I-40 Bus.						
EF1	Valley Brook	Oklahoma	OK		06:59–07:04	4.6 mi (7.4 km)	100 yd (91 m)
EF1	A QLCS tornado touched down in southeast Oklahoma City and tracked southeast, crossing I-35/US 62/US 77 and moving through Valley Brook, causing roof damage to a number of homes and businesses along its path. Damage was concentrated in several areas before the tornado dissipated after crossing I-240/SH-3.						
EF1	Harrah	Oklahoma, Lincoln	OK		07:12–07:15	3.4 mi (5.5 km)	75 yd (69 m)
EF1	This tornado developed near the North Canadian River and moved southeast through Harrah, damaging trees, power lines, and power poles. It then turned east to east-northeast out of town before crossing into Lincoln County just north of US 62 and dissipating shortly afterward.						
EF1	Wetumka	Hughes	OK		08:10–08:16	5.3 mi (8.5 km)	100 yd (91 m)
EF1	This tornado began just south of SH-9 west of Wetumka and moved east, damaging trees and power lines near the intersection of SH-9 and SH-27. The tornado reached peak intensity southeast of Wetumka, where additional trees and power poles were damaged and several trees were uprooted before the tornado dissipated.						
EF1	Ozark	Franklin	AR		11:16–11:24	3.3 mi (5.3 km)	400 yd (370 m)
EF1	This early morning hours tornado touched down west of the city of Ozark, initially traveling east-northeast. Numerous trees were snapped or uprooted, with some landing onto homes, and an outbuilding was destroyed east of US 64. Then the tornado went through two neighborhoods, snapping and uprooting trees, with homes damaged by tree limbs falling on them. The tornado turned southeast and crossed US 64, snapping more trees and damaging signs. The tornado dissipated shortly after crossing the Arkansas River.						
EF0	N of Larkin	Jackson	AL		18:33–18:34	0.54 mi (0.87 km)	100 yd (91 m)
EF0	This tornado touched down north of Larkin, initially inflicting moderate tree damage. It then destroyed a chicken coop and a barn building and uprooted a tree. The tornado continued debranching trees before quickly dissipating.						
EFU	SE of Fort Stockton	Pecos	TX		20:05–20:15	2.17 mi (3.49 km)	30 yd (27 m)
EFU	This tornado remained in rural areas. No damage was found.						
EF2	SW of Savageton	Campbell	WY		20:31–21:05	12.7 mi (20.4 km)	600 yd (550 m)
EF2	This strong tornado snapped 13 power poles at their bases, and inflicted significant structural damage to at least one home.						
EF1	SE of New Market (1st tornado)	Madison	AL		20:58–21:04	5.51 mi (8.87 km)	60 yd (55 m)
EF1	Trees were snapped and softwood trees were debranched.						
EFU	S of Kimball (1st tornado)	Kimball	NE		21:01–21:11	0.87 mi (1.40 km)	15 yd (14 m)
EFU	A landspout was observed by storm chasers in an open field. No damage was reported.						
EF0	SE of New Market (2nd tornado)	Madison	AL		21:03–21:04	2.75 mi (4.43 km)	30 yd (27 m)
EF0	This satellite tornado to the New Market EF1 tornado snapped power poles and snapped or uprooted trees.						
EFU	S of Kimball (2nd tornado)	Kimball	NE		21:05–21:12	0.61 mi (0.98 km)	10 yd (9.1 m)
EFU	Another weak landspout was documented occurring alongside the first landspout. No damage was reported.						
EF1	S of Vanderbilt	Fayette	PA		21:14–21:16	1.12 mi (1.80 km)	140 yd (130 m)
EF1	This brief tornado caused mainly tree damage and minor structural damage before lifting.						
EF1	NW of Francisco (1st tornado)	Franklin	TN		21:18–21:19	0.72 mi (1.16 km)	160 yd (150 m)
EF1	This high-end EF1 tornado snapped and uprooted numerous trees.						
EF0	NW of Francisco (2nd tornado)	Jackson	AL		21:18–21:19	0.16 mi (0.26 km)	60 yd (55 m)
EF0	A twin tornado to the first Francisco tornado snapped or uprooted and debranched trees.						
EF0	E of Fairmont	Marion	WV		22:11–22:12	0.22 mi (0.35 km)	25 yd (23 m)
EF0	A narrow swath of trees was downed, one falling on a car.						
EF0	W of Mutual	Calvert	MD		23:02–23:04	1.3 mi (2.1 km)	75 yd (69 m)
EF0	Large tree limbs were snapped, including one that fell on a dock.						
EFU	WSW of Fowler	Pueblo, Otero	CO		23:16–23:25	2.40 mi (3.86 km)	
EFU	This landspout tornado remained in open fields.						
EFU	SW of Fowler	Pueblo	CO		23:42–23:47	1.64 mi (2.64 km)	
EFU	This hybrid tornado remained in open fields southwest of the Fowler Airport.						
EF1	NE of Moatsville to W of Kasson	Barbour	WV		23:50–23:52	1.13 mi (1.82 km)	275 yd (251 m)
EF1	A barn was destroyed with debris scattered from northwest to southeast of the original structure. A double-wide also sustained siding and window damage. Further along the path, several healthy and mature locust trees were snapped or uprooted.						

=== June 23 event ===
List of confirmed tornadoes – Tuesday, June 23, 2026
EF#	Location	County / Parish	State	Start Coord.	Time (UTC)	Path length	Max width
EF0	SE of Medicine Bow	Carbon	WY	41.8637°N 106.1199°W	23:29–23:31	0.45 mi (0.72 km)	10 yd (9.1 m)
EF0	An EF0 tornado was confirmed by NWS Cheyenne. Preliminary information.						
EFU	S of Bagley to WNW of Alida	Clearwater	MN	47.42°N 95.39°W	23:30–23:37	2.69 mi (4.33 km)	25 yd (23 m)
EFU	A storm chaser documented a tornado that tracked through open fields, causing no damage.						
EF1	Plain Dealing	Bossier	LA	32.909°N 93.7199°W	01:40–01:46	4.6 mi (7.4 km)	300 yd (270 m)
EF1	A tornado uprooted many trees.						

=== June 24 event ===
List of confirmed tornadoes – Wednesday, June 24, 2026
EF#	Location	County / Parish	State	Start Coord.	Time (UTC)	Path length	Max width
EF0	W of Huntley	McHenry	IL	42.1626°N 88.4882°W	22:34–22:35	0.32 mi (0.51 km)	10 yd (9.1 m)
EF0	A brief tornado touched down in a field before moving southeast and damaging the roof of a barn, scattering metal roofing panels 200–300 yd (180–270 m) away. It also downed several tree limbs and damaged a utility pole before dissipating.						
EFU	E of Iliff	Logan	CO	40.78°N 102.91°W	00:13–00:14	0.35 mi (0.56 km)	20 yd (18 m)
EFU	This tornado remained over an open field.						
EFU	NW of Fleming	Logan	CO	40.7°N 102.86°W	00:25–00:26	0.28 mi (0.45 km)	10 yd (9.1 m)
EFU	Local fire department officials observed a brief tornado over an open field.						
EFU	SSE of Keota	Weld	CO	40.67°N 104.06°W	01:42–01:43	0.01 mi (0.016 km)	10 yd (9.1 m)
EFU	A brief tornado touched down over open land. No damage occurred.						

=== June 25 event ===
List of confirmed tornadoes – Thursday, June 25, 2026
EF#	Location	County / Parish	State	Start Coord.	Time (UTC)	Path length	Max width
EFU	E of Avena	Fayette	IL	38.99°N 88.90°W	17:41–17:42	0.21 mi (0.34 km)	8 yd (7.3 m)
EFU	An EFU tornado was confirmed by NWS St. Louis. Preliminary information.						
EF0	NNE of Jeffrey City	Fremont	WY	42.6471°N 107.7373°W	19:51–19:53	0.9 mi (1.4 km)	30 yd (27 m)
EF0	Students from the University of Wyoming observed a tornado that remained over open country.						
EFU	NNE of Elmwood	Beaver	OK	36.6949°N 100.5038°W	21:18–21:21	0.67 mi (1.08 km)	30 yd (27 m)
EFU	A tornado observed by multiple storm chasers remained over rural land causing no damage.						
EF0	NE of Elmwood	Beaver	OK	36.6866°N 100.4483°W	21:29–21:37	1.9 mi (3.1 km)	100 yd (91 m)
EF0	This tornado snapped large branches that landed on a dilapidated home.						
EF0	Los Lunas	Valencia	NM	34.8088°N 106.7717°W	21:34–21:41	1.2 mi (1.9 km)	60 yd (55 m)
EF0	This landspout tornado uplifted a metal awning and damaged vehicles with flying debris. Batting cage netting was thrown onto a light pole in a baseball field southeast of the Los Lunas High School.						
EF0	SE of Kennonsburg to SSE of Batesville	Noble	OH	39.9028°N 81.3554°W	21:49–21:57	4.73 mi (7.61 km)	200 yd (180 m)
EF0	Numerous trees and tree branches were downed, some of which fell onto homes and vehicles, damaging them.						
EFU	WSW of Slapout	Beaver	OK	36.5796°N 100.2506°W	21:52–21:58	1.49 mi (2.40 km)	50 yd (46 m)
EFU	This tornado remained over open country and caused no damage.						
EF1	W of Allison	Wheeler	TX	35.6064°N 100.176°W	23:59–00:08	2.34 mi (3.77 km)	50 yd (46 m)
EF1	An outbuilding was destroyed, large tree limbs were snapped, and power poles were snapped as well.						

=== June 26 event ===
List of confirmed tornadoes – Friday, June 26, 2026
EF#	Location	County / Parish	State	Start Coord.	Time (UTC)	Path length	Max width
EFU	WNW of Miramar	Broward	FL	26.08°N 80.77°W	17:24	0.36 mi (0.58 km)	25 yd (23 m)
EFU	A landspout was observed south of I-75.						
EFU	SW of Cairo, IL	Mississippi	MO	36.9795°N 89.2024°W	23:01–23:02	0.09 mi (0.14 km)	25 yd (23 m)
EFU	This tornado briefly touched down, with no damage documented.						
EF1	N of Ava	Douglas	MO	37.0027°N 92.6748°W	23:03–23:05	0.46 mi (0.74 km)	75 yd (69 m)
EF1	Trees were snapped or uprooted and large tree branches were tossed around.						
EF0	N of Mountain Dale	Webster	MO	37.2082°N 92.7614°W	23:52–23:58	1.5 mi (2.4 km)	75 yd (69 m)
EF0	This tornado collapsed the roof of an outbuilding and uprooted several trees.						
EFU	NE of Las Animas	Bent	CO	38.1423°N 103.1066°W	00:52–00:53	0.24 mi (0.39 km)	
EFU	This brief spin-up tornado drifted northeastward. It potentially caused tree damage, but this remains unconfirmed, resulting in its current rating of EFU.						
EF0	Northern Memphis	Clark	IN	38.496°N 85.7679°W	01:03–01:04	0.32 mi (0.51 km)	25 yd (23 m)
EF0	A few homes suffered roofing damage in a neighborhood.						

=== June 27 event ===
List of confirmed tornadoes – Saturday, June 27, 2026
EF#	Location	County / Parish	State	Start Coord.	Time (UTC)	Path length	Max width
EF0	Northern Stoy	Crawford	IL	39°N 87.83°W	19:00–19:01	0.54 mi (0.87 km)	30 yd (27 m)
EF0	Several tree branches were snapped.						
EF0	SW of Poseyville	Posey	IN	38.1344°N 87.8735°W	20:24–20:26	1.56 mi (2.51 km)	50 yd (46 m)
EF0	This tornado snapped multiple limbs and branches from trees.						
EF0	N of Lynnville to SW of Spurgeon	Warrick, Pike	IN	38.2405°N 87.3075°W	20:36–20:37	0.73 mi (1.17 km)	50 yd (46 m)
EF0	This tornado pushed a semi-trailer off its blocks and displaced a grain cart. Softwood trees were also debranched before the tornado lifted.						
EFU	E of Ledbetter	Livingston	KY	37.0456°N 88.4405°W	22:27–22:28	0.16 mi (0.26 km)	50 yd (46 m)
EFU	This very brief tornadic waterspout formed on the Tennessee River. No damage occurred.						
EF1	N of Brookport	Massac	IL	37.1342°N 88.6475°W	23:14–23:16	1.53 mi (2.46 km)	75 yd (69 m)
EF1	This tornado snapped multiple trees and damaged the awning of a home north of Brookport.						
EF1	NNE of Belfield	Billings	ND	46.9876°N 103.161°W	00:28–00:31	0.18 mi (0.29 km)	50 yd (46 m)
EF1	A tornado uprooted and knocked over multiple large spruce trees in different directions and damaged several apple and olive trees. A nearby house and detached garage sustained minor roof damage and broken windows.						

=== June 28 event ===
List of confirmed tornadoes – Sunday, June 28, 2026
EF#	Location	County / Parish	State	Start Coord.	Time (UTC)	Path length	Max width
EF0	North Fort Myers	Lee	FL	26.7°N 81.91°W	21:14–21:15	0.12 mi (0.19 km)	25 yd (23 m)
EF0	A brief tornado damaged the roofs of two mobile homes.						
EFU	E of Riverdale	McLean	ND	47.4825°N 101.2925°W	02:00–02:04	1.48 mi (2.38 km)	50 yd (46 m)
EFU	This stovepipe tornado remained over open lands. No damage occurred.						

=== June 29 event ===
List of confirmed tornadoes – Monday, June 29, 2026
EF#	Location	County / Parish	State	Start Coord.	Time (UTC)	Path length	Max width
EFU	SSW of Andover	Day	SD	45.35°N 97.95°W	13:01–13:02	0.11 mi (0.18 km)	1 yd (0.91 m)
EFU	This tornado was recorded in a field, inflicting no damage.						
EF0	NE of Hawley	Clay	MN	46.94°N 96.405°W	01:48–01:52	2.4 mi (3.9 km)	30 yd (27 m)
EF0	A shelterbelt sustained minor tree damage.						

=== June 30 event ===
List of confirmed tornadoes – Tuesday, June 30, 2026
EF#	Location	County / Parish	State	Start Coord.	Time (UTC)	Path length	Max width
EF0	SE of Hoskins	Stanton	NE	42.08°N 97.27°W	05:16–05:17	1.06 mi (1.71 km)	25 yd (23 m)
EF0	This tornado touched down and impacted a farm, where it destroyed a barn, removed shingles from the roof of a home, and damaged several trees and a grain bin. The tornado continued east-northeast across a pasture, damaging more trees before ultimately lifting.						
EF1	NW of Central Lakes	St. Louis	MN	47.2865°N 92.5035°W	05:36–05:38	1.6 mi (2.6 km)	100 yd (91 m)
EF1	Hundreds of trees were damaged, including dozens either uprooted or snapped near the base.						
EF1	NNW of Beaver Falls	Lewis	NY	43.9011°N 75.4486°W	18:00–18:01	0.63 mi (1.01 km)	150 yd (140 m)
EF1	Several trees and power poles were damaged.						
EFU	E of Wytheville	Wythe	VA	36.95°N 81.03°W	18:40	Unknown	Unknown
EFU	A landspout was photographed alongside I-81. No damage occurred. This is the first documented tornado in Wythe County since reliable records began in 1950.						
EF1	E of New Berlin to SE of Morris	Otsego	NY	42.6258°N 75.2398°W	20:34–20:52	8.39 mi (13.50 km)	300 yd (270 m)
EF1	This tornado produced a corridor of tree damage north and south of NY 51.						
EF0	SSE of Trenary	Delta, Alger	MI	46.158°N 86.9609°W	23:33–23:35	0.57 mi (0.92 km)	25 yd (23 m)
EF0	A few trees were snapped or uprooted.						
EFU	E of Sterling	Logan	CO	40.6403°N 103.1296°W	01:46–01:47	0.06 mi (0.097 km)	5 yd (4.6 m)
EFU	A brief tornado occurred over an open field.						
EF1	Southeastern Iliff	Logan	CO	40.7528°N 103.0608°W	01:30–01:33	0.11 mi (0.18 km)	30 yd (27 m)
EF1	One unoccupied mobile home was heavily damaged.						

== See also ==
- Tornadoes of 2026
- List of United States tornadoes in April 2026
- List of United States tornadoes from July to September 2026
