= Missouri Route 190 =

State highway in Missouri, U.S.

Route 190
- MO 190 highlighted in red

Route information
- Maintained by MoDOT
- Length: 35.166 mi (56.594 km)

Major junctions
- West end: Route 146 west of Trenton
- Route 6 north of Jamesport
- East end: US 65 north of Chillicothe

Location
- Country: United States
- State: Missouri

Highway system
- Missouri State Highway System; Interstate; US; State; Supplemental
← Route 187	→ Route 202

Route 190 is a highway in northern Missouri. Its eastern (or southern) terminus is at U.S. Route 65 north of Chillicothe; its western (or northern) terminus is at Route 146 west of Trenton.

== Route description ==
The northern terminus of Route 190 is at an intersection with Route 146 just west of Edinburg, Missouri in Grundy County. It then heads southwesterly into Daviess County and turns south at Route B and begins to head south towards Jamesport, Missouri. North of Jamesport, Route 190 intersects with Missouri Route 6; then Route 190 has a short concurrency with Route F in Jamesport. Heading south from Jamesport, it travels towards Lock Springs, Missouri, but about 2 miles before it travels under the Union Pacific railroad bridge. After going through Lock Springs, Route 190 enters Livingston County and heads east towards Chillicothe, crossing over the Thompson River, and reaches its southern terminus at US 65.

== Major intersections ==
County	Location	mi	km	Destinations	Notes
Grundy	Madison Township	0.000	0.000	Route 146 – Jamesport	
Daviess	Jamesport Township	11.459	18.441	Route 6 – Trenton, Gallatin	
Livingston	Chillicothe	35.166	56.594	US 65 – Trenton, Carrollton	
1.000 mi = 1.609 km; 1.000 km = 0.621 mi
