= Carlow, Missouri =

Extinct Hamlet in Missouri, U.S.

Coordinates: 39°52′51″N 93°49′57″W

Carlow is an extinct hamlet in southeast Daviess County, in the U.S. state of Missouri.

The community is located on Missouri Route V 3.5 miles northwest of Lock Springs and seven miles southeast of Gallatin. Muddy Creek flows past the east side of the community to join the Grand River one-half mile to the south.

== History ==
A variant name was Jackson Station. A post office called Jackson's Station was established in 1871, the name was changed to Carlow in 1882, and the post office closed in 1927. The present name is after Joseph H. Carlow, the proprietor of a.local sawmill.
