= Wamsley Creek =

Stream in the U.S. state of Missouri

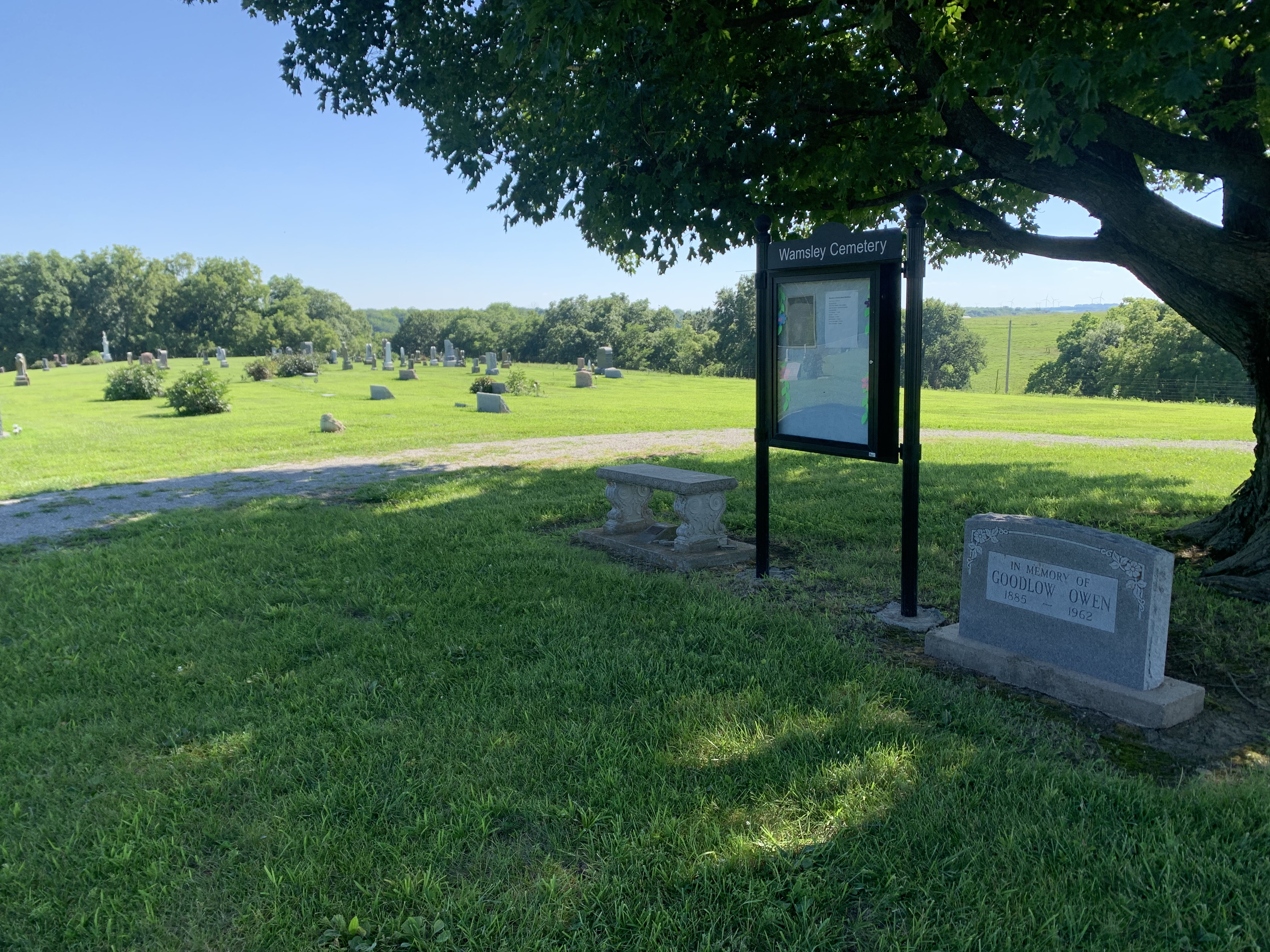
Wamsley Cemetery in Grand River Township

Wamsley Creek is a stream in Daviess and DeKalb Counties in the U.S. state of Missouri.

The stream headwaters arise in western Daviess County just north of the community of Mabel and west of US Route 69 at 39°49′41″N 94°12′09″W and it flows west into Dekalb County to enter Grindstone Creek just south of the community of Fordham at 39°49′37″N 94°16′04″W.

Wamsley Creek was named after H. and I. C. Wamsley, the original owners of the site.

== See also ==
- List of rivers of Missouri
