= Coffey, Missouri =

- City
- Location of Coffey, Missouri
- Coordinates: 40°06′20″N 94°00′24″W
- Country: United States
- State: Missouri
- County: Daviess

Area
  - Total: 0.21 sq mi (0.54 km^{2})
  - Land: 0.21 sq mi (0.54 km^{2})
  - Water: 0 sq mi (0.00 km^{2})
- Elevation: 932 ft (284 m)

Population (2020)
  - Total: 151
  - Density: 725.0/sq mi (279.92/km^{2})
- Time zone: UTC-6 (Central (CST))
  - Summer (DST): UTC-5 (CDT)
- ZIP code: 64636
- Area code: 660
- FIPS code: 29-15274
- GNIS feature ID: 2393584

Coffey is a city in northern Daviess County, Missouri, United States. The population was 151 at the 2020 census.

== History ==
Coffey was originally called Salem and then Coffeyburg, and under the latter name was laid out in 1856 by B. H. Coffey, and named for him. A post office called Coffeysburg was established in 1867, and the name was changed to Coffey in 1910.

== Geography ==
Coffey is located in north central Daviess County on Missouri Route 13. Jameson is eight miles to the south and Gallatin is approximately 12 miles to the south on Route 13.

According to the United States Census Bureau, the city has a total area of 0.21 square miles (0.54 km^{2}), all land.

== Demographics ==
Historical population
Census	Pop.	Note	%±
1880	75		—
1890	70		−6.7%
1900	390		457.1%
1910	349		−10.5%
1920	367		5.2%
1930	275		−25.1%
1940	245		−10.9%
1950	253		3.3%
1960	190		−24.9%
1970	157		−17.4%
1980	165		5.1%
1990	131		−20.6%
2000	140		6.9%
2010	166		18.6%
2020	151		−9.0%
U.S. Decennial Census

=== 2010 census ===
At the 2010 census there were 166 people in 60 households, including 47 families, in the city. The population density was 790.5 inhabitants per square mile (305.2/km^{2}). There were 76 housing units at an average density of 361.9 per square mile (139.7/km^{2}). The racial makup of the city was 100.0% White. Of the 60 households 40.0% had children under the age of 18 living with them, 63.3% were married couples living together, 6.7% had a female householder with no husband present, 8.3% had a male householder with no wife present, and 21.7% were non-families. 18.3% of households were one person and 5% were one person aged 65 or older. The average household size was 2.77 and the average family size was 3.11.

The median age was 33.2 years. 28.9% of residents were under the age of 18; 7.1% were between the ages of 18 and 24; 28.2% were from 25 to 44; 21.6% were from 45 to 64; and 13.9% were 65 or older. The gender makeup of the city was 46.4% male and 53.6% female.

=== 2000 census ===
At the 2000 census there were 140 people in 56 households, including 38 families, in the city. The population density was 692.4 inhabitants per square mile (267.3/km^{2}). There were 64 housing units at an average density of 316.5 per square mile (122.2/km^{2}). The racial makup of the city was 96.43% White and 3.57% Native American. Hispanic or Latino of any race were 1.43%.

Of the 56 households 37.5% had children under the age of 18 living with them, 55.4% were married couples living together, 8.9% had a female householder with no husband present, and 30.4% were non-families. 28.6% of households were one person and 17.9% were one person aged 65 or older. The average household size was 2.50 and the average family size was 3.05.

The age distribution was 28.6% under the age of 18, 10.7% from 18 to 24, 18.6% from 25 to 44, 23.6% from 45 to 64, and 18.6% 65 or older. The median age was 41 years. For every 100 females, there were 66.7 males. For every 100 females age 18 and over, there were 81.8 males.

The median household income was $15,000 and the median family income was $17,813. Males had a median income of $24,167 versus $14,375 for females. The per capita income for the city was $11,415. There were 38.5% of families and 43.1% of the population living below the poverty line, including 61.5% of under eighteens and 26.3% of those over 64.

== Education ==
It is in the North Daviess R-III School District.
