= Grindstone Creek (Grand River tributary) =

Stream in the U.S. state of Missouri

Grindstone Creek is a stream in Clinton, DeKalb and Daviess counties in the U.S. state of Missouri. It is a tributary of the Grand River.

The stream headwaters are in northern Clinton County south of the community of Osborn at 39°43′50″N 94°22′01″W. The stream flows northeast through southeastern DeKalb County past the community of Fordham and passing under Missouri Route 6 1.5 miles east of Weatherby. It enters Daviess County approximately three miles northeast of Weatherby and flows north crossing under Missouri Route E one half mile west of Santa Rosa. The strem turns to the northeast for another four miles to its confluence with the Grand two miles south of Pattonsburg at 40°01′08″N 94°08′09″W.

Grindstone Creek was named for the fact grindstones were sourced from quarries along its course.

== Tributaries ==
- Wamsley Creek

== See also ==
- List of rivers of Missouri
