= Civil Bend =

Civil Bend may refer to one of the following places:

- Civil Bend, Iowa
- Civil Bend, Missouri
