= Santa Rosa, Missouri =

Unincorporated community in Missouri, U.S.

Coordinates: 39°58′47″N 94°12′20″W

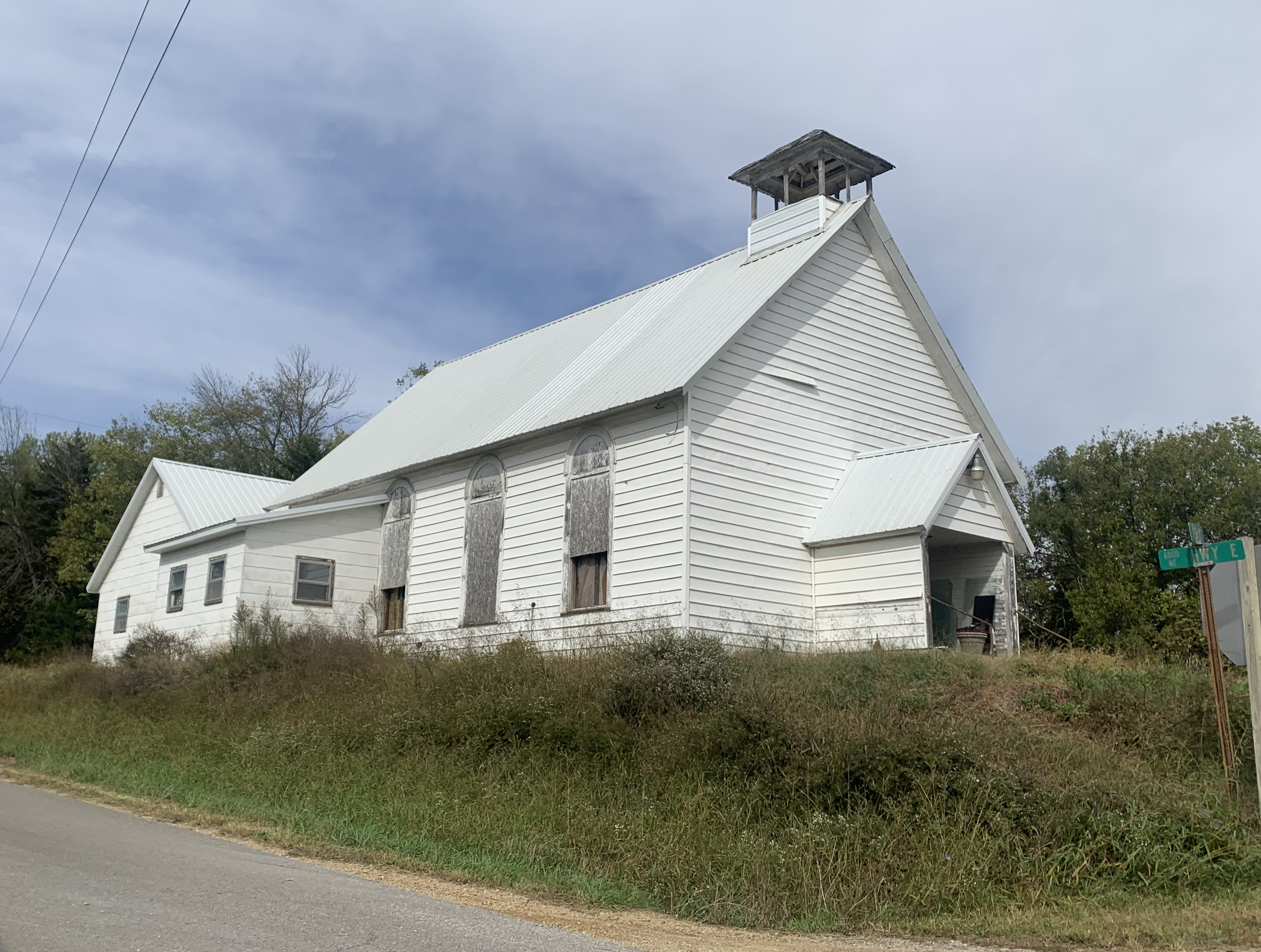
Unknown former church in Santa Rosa

Santa Rosa is an unincorporated community in northeast DeKalb County, in the U.S. state of Missouri.

The community sits adjacent to the DeKalb–Daviess county line on the north side of Missouri Route E. Grindstone Creek flows past one–quarter mile to the east.

== History ==
A post office called Santa Rosa was established in 1875, and remained in operation until 1954. Besides the post office the community had a schoolhouse, the Santa Rosa School.

== Demographics ==
Santa Rosa was incorporated during the 1930 and 1940 US census.

Historical population
Census	Pop.	Note	%±
1930	122		—
1940	141		15.6%
Missouri Census Data Center
