= Salem Township, Daviess County, Missouri =

Township in Daviess County, Missouri, U.S.

Salem Township
- Township
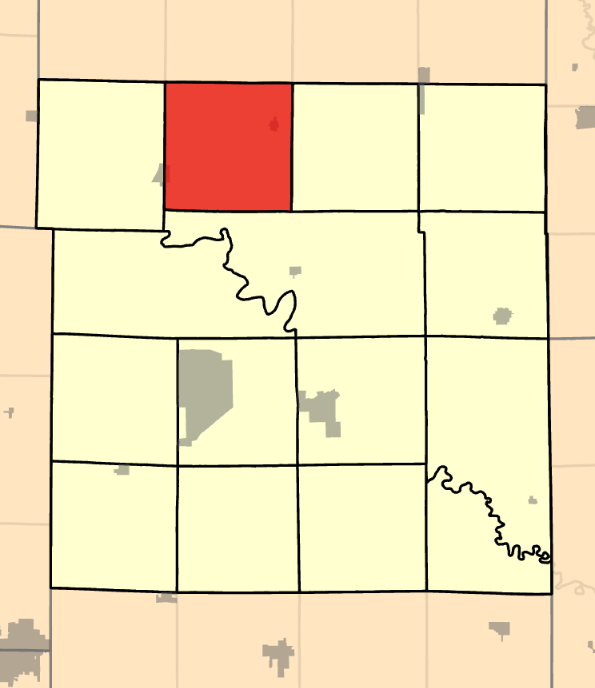
- Coordinates: 40°05′43″N 94°02′21″W
- Country: United States
- State: Missouri
- County: Daviess

Area
  - Total: 36.39 sq mi (94.2 km^{2})
  - Land: 36.14 sq mi (93.6 km^{2})
  - Water: 0.25 sq mi (0.65 km^{2}) 0.69%
- Elevation: 860 ft (260 m)

Population (2020)
  - Total: 440
  - Density: 12.2/sq mi (4.7/km^{2})
- FIPS code: 29-06165198
- GNIS feature ID: 766587

Salem Township is a township in Daviess County, Missouri, United States. At the 2020 census, its population was 440.

Salem Township was established in 1859. The town of Coffey was originally settled in 1856 and called Salem.
