= Jamesport =

Jamesport is the name of two places in the United States:

- Jamesport, Missouri
- Jamesport, New York
