= Wamsley (disambiguation) =

Wamsley, Ohio is an unincorporated community in Ohio, US.

Wamsley may also refer to:

- Gary Wamsley, American public administration specialist and professor
- James Wamsley, American politician
- John Wamsley, Australian environmentalist
- Rick Wamsley, Canadian professional ice hockey goaltender
- Wamsley Creek, a stream in Missouri (USA)
- 33681 Wamsley, a minor planet

== See also ==
- Murder of Rick and Suzanna Wamsley
- Other C. Wamsley House, historic octagon house in Hamilton, Montana (USA)
