= Lake Viking, Missouri =

- Census-designated place
- Location within Missouri
- Coordinates: 39°55′31″N 94°04′09″W
- Country: United States
- State: Missouri
- County: Daviess

Area
  - Total: 8.75 sq mi (22.66 km^{2})
  - Land: 7.88 sq mi (20.40 km^{2})
  - Water: 0.87 sq mi (2.26 km^{2})
- Elevation: 866 ft (264 m)

Population (2020)
  - Total: 486
  - Density: 61.7/sq mi (23.82/km^{2})
- Time zone: UTC-6 (Central (CST))
  - Summer (DST): UTC-5 (CDT)
- ZIP code: 64640
- Area code: 660
- FIPS code: 29-40304
- GNIS feature ID: 2587085
- Website: lakevikingmo.com

Lake Viking is an unincorporated community and census-designated place (CDP) in Daviess County, Missouri, United States. The population was 486 at the 2020 census.

== Geography ==
The Lake Viking CDP is located southwest of the center of Daviess County, around a reservoir named Lake Viking, an impoundment on South Big Creek, a tributary of the Grand River. The CDP extends southwest as far as the village of Altamont. The community is 3 miles (5 km) east of Interstate 35 and 68 miles (109 km) northeast of Kansas City.

According to the United States Census Bureau, the CDP has a total area of 8.8 square miles (22.7 km^{2}), of which 7.9 square miles (20.4 km^{2}) is land and 0.87 square miles (2.26 km^{2}), or 9.97%, is water.

The lake is a private man-made reservoir spanning about 630 acres.

== Demographics ==
Historical population
| Census | Pop. | Note | %± |
|---|---|---|---|
| 2020 | 486 | | — |
U.S. Decennial Census

== Education ==
Part of the CDP is in the Winston R-VI School District and part is in the Gallatin R-V School District.
