= Altamont, Missouri =

Village in Missouri, United States

- Village
- Village of Altamont
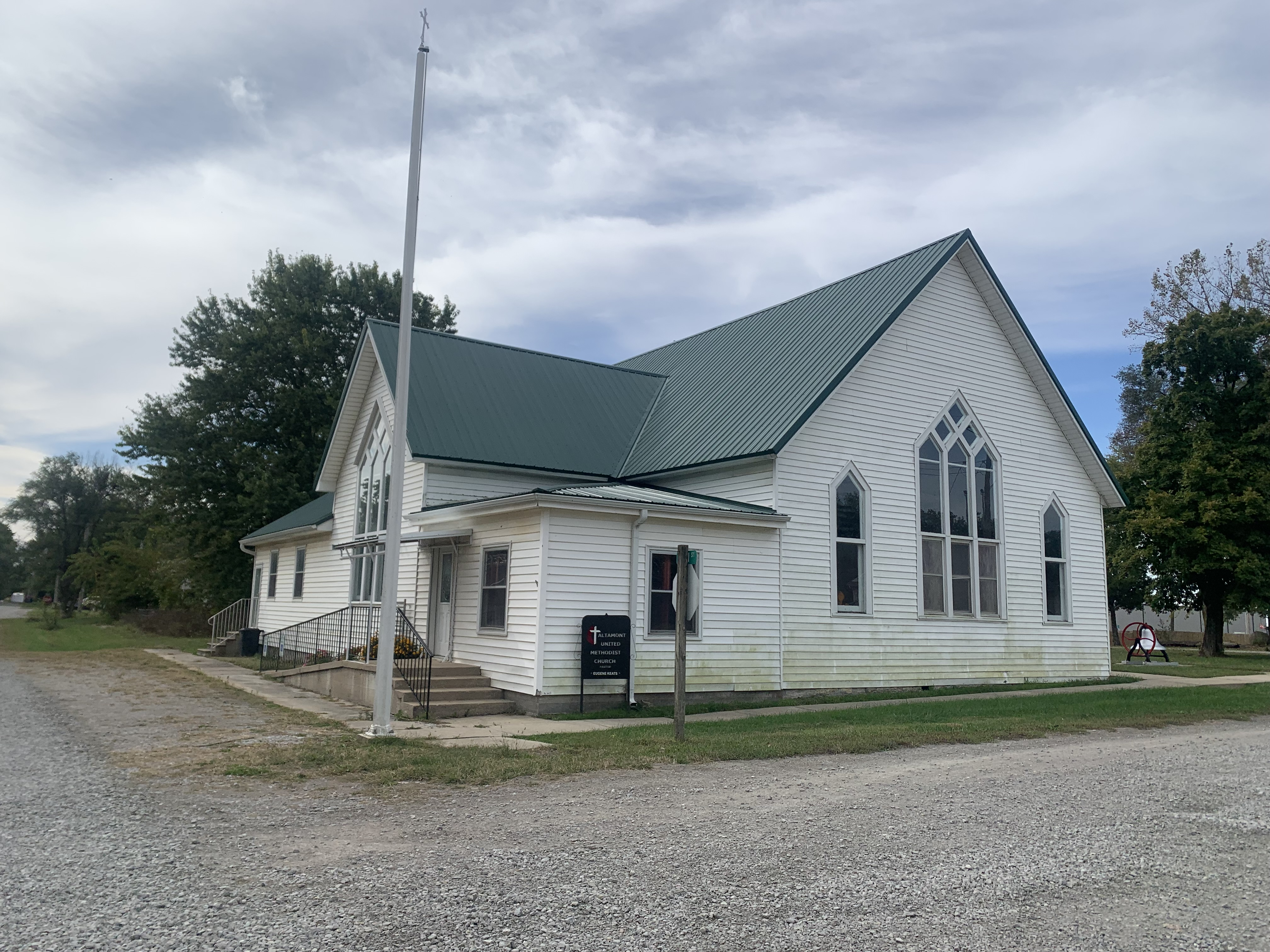
- Atlamont United Methodist Church

- Location of Altamont, Missouri
- Coordinates: 39°53′18″N 94°05′12″W
- Country: United States
- State: Missouri
- County: Daviess
- Founded: 1890
- Incorporated: 1896

Area
  - Total: 0.26 sq mi (0.67 km^{2})
  - Land: 0.25 sq mi (0.66 km^{2})
  - Water: 0.0039 sq mi (0.01 km^{2})
- Elevation: 1,017 ft (310 m)

Population (2020)
  - Total: 171
  - Density: 667.7/sq mi (257.79/km^{2})
- Time zone: UTC-6 (Central (CST))
  - Summer (DST): UTC-5 (CDT)
- ZIP code: 64620
- Area code: 660
- FIPS code: 29-00910
- GNIS feature ID: 2397947

Altamont (/ˈæltəmɒnt/ AL-tə-mont) is a village in southwest Daviess County, Missouri, United States. The population was 171 at the 2020 census.

== History ==
Altamont, the youngest town in the county, was laid out circa 1890. The town was so named on account of its lofty elevation. A post office called Altamont has been in operation since 1890.

== Geography ==
Altamont is located on Missouri Route 6 approximately three miles northeast of Winston. Gallatin lies about six miles to the northeast.

According to the United States Census Bureau, the village has a total area of 0.26 square miles (0.67 km^{2}), all land.

== Demographics ==
Historical population
Census	Pop.	Note	%±
1900	288		—
1910	270		−6.2%
1920	349		29.3%
1930	272		−22.1%
1940	274		0.7%
1950	178		−35.0%
1960	190		6.7%
1970	225		18.4%
1980	192		−14.7%
1990	188		−2.1%
2000	218		16.0%
2010	204		−6.4%
2020	171		−16.2%
U.S. Decennial Census

As of 2000 the median income for a household in the village was $35,972, and the median income for a family was $36,250. Males had a median income of $40,750 versus $28,472 for females. The per capita income for the village was $13,941. About 30.2% of families and 28.4% of the population were below the poverty line, including 33.3% of those under the age of eighteen and 22.2% of those 65 or over.

=== 2010 census ===
At the 2010 census, there were 204 people, 79 households, and 56 families residing in the village. The population density was 680.0 inhabitants per square mile (262.5/km^{2}). There were 106 housing units at an average density of 353.3 per square mile (136.4/km^{2}). The racial makeup of the village was 99.51% White and 0.49% Native American.

There were 79 households, of which 38.0% had children under the age of 18 living with them, 46.8% were married couples living together, 16.5% had a female householder with no husband present, and 29.1% were non-families. 24.1% of all households were individuals, and 11.4% had someone living alone who was 65 years of age or older. The average household size was 2.58 and the average family size was 3.07.

The age distribution was 29.9% under the age of 18, 6.3% from 18 to 24, 24.0% from 25 to 44, 26.5% from 45 to 64, and 13.3% who were 65 years of age or older. The median age was 37.5 years. For every 100 females, there were 96.2 males. For every 100 females age 18 and over, there were 98.6 males.

== Education ==
PreK-12 public education is provided by the Gallatin R-V School District in Gallatin.. PreK-6 is located at Covel D. Searcy Elementary School, and 7–12 at Gallatin High School.

Of adults 25 years of age and older in Altamont, 94.3% possess a high school diploma or higher, while 6.6% hold a bachelor's degree or higher as their highest educational attainment.
