= Union Township, Daviess County, Missouri =

Township in Daviess County, Missouri, U.S.

Union Township
- Township
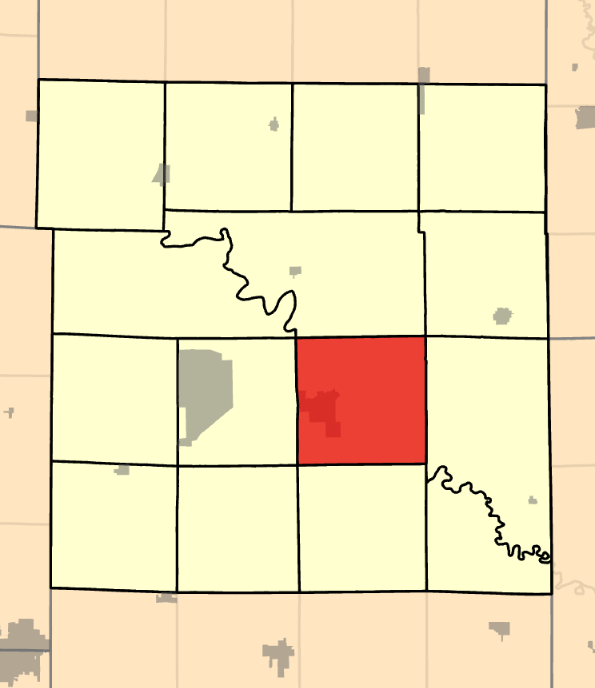
- Coordinates: 39°54′49″N 93°55′36″W
- Country: United States
- State: Missouri
- County: Daviess

Area
  - Total: 36.8 sq mi (95 km^{2})
  - Land: 36.3 sq mi (94 km^{2})
  - Water: 0.5 sq mi (1.3 km^{2}) 1.36%
- Elevation: 791 ft (241 m)

Population (2020)
  - Total: 2,127
  - Density: 58.6/sq mi (22.6/km^{2})
- FIPS code: 29-06174590
- GNIS feature ID: 766589

Union Township is a township in Daviess County, Missouri, United States. At the 2020 census, its population was 2,127.

Union Township was named such because a large share of the county residents were pro-Union during the Civil War.
