= Larry Holley =

American basketball player and coach (1945–2022)

Biographical details
- Born: June 28, 1945; Bethany, Missouri, U.S.
- Died: May 12, 2022 (aged 76); Liberty, Missouri, U.S.

Playing career
- c. 1967: William Jewell

Coaching career (HC unless noted)
- 1969–1975: Central Methodist
- 1977–1979: Northwest Missouri State
- 1979–2019: William Jewell

Head coaching record
- Overall: 919–579 (.613)

Larry Holley (June 28, 1945 – May 12, 2022) was an American college basketball coach. He was the head men's basketball coach at his alma mater, William Jewell College in Liberty, Missouri. His 919 career wins made him one of only 10 four-year college coaches (National Collegiate Athletic Association (NCAA) and National Association of Intercollegiate Athletics (NAIA)) to amass 900 career wins. He ranks first all-time in career wins among four-year, college coaches coaching only at Missouri colleges and universities.

Holley's teams won 20 games in a season 24 times and have posted both a 45-game conference winning streak and a 43-game home court winning streak.

He received 14 Coach of the Year awards and was elected to the Greater Kansas City Basketball Coaches Hall of Fame, the Missouri Basketball Coaches Hall of Fame, the NAIA Hall of Fame and the William Jewell College Athletic Hall of Fame. Holley won the William Jewell Citation for Achievement Award winner in 2009. In April 2022, he was presented with the Small College Basketball Lifetime Achievement Award.

Holley joined William Jewell as head men's basketball coach for the 1979–80 season after coaching four years at Northwest Missouri State University, six years at Central Methodist University and one year at Harrisburg, Missouri High School.

He attended Jameson High School (Missouri) and graduated from William Jewell College in 1967, where he was a four-year-letterman in cross country, basketball and track. He captained in all three sports. As a basketball player, he scored a total of 1,122 points for Jewell and was an All-Conference and All-District selection his senior season. As a track runner, he won a state championship in the mile (indoor).

He was a native of Jameson, Missouri. As a musician, he was a trumpet player and vocalist and a member of William Jewell's Concert and Pep Band and Chapel Choir. Holley had three daughters.

== Head coaching record ==
Record table
Season	Team	Overall	Conference	Standing	Postseason
Central Methodist Eagles (Missouri College Athletic Union) (1969–1971)
1969–70	Central Methodist	7–17			
1970–71	Central Methodist	6–17			
Central Methodist Eagles (Heart of America Athletic Conference) (1971–1975)
1971–72	Central Methodist	10–16			
1972–73	Central Methodist	11–15			
1973–74	Central Methodist	15–11			
1974–75	Central Methodist	12–17			
Central Methodist:		61–93			
Northwest Missouri State Bearcats (Missouri Intercollegiate Athletic Association) (1977–1979)
1977–78	Northwest Missouri State	11–15			
1978–79	Northwest Missouri State	15–11			
Northwest Missouri State:		26–26			
William Jewell Cardinals (Heart of America Athletic Conference) (1979–2011)
1979–80	William Jewell	10–19	6–8		
1980–81	William Jewell	15–13	12–4		
1981–82	William Jewell	22–8	14–2	1st	
1982–83	William Jewell	19–10	9–5		
1983–84	William Jewell	20–8	11–3		
1984–85	William Jewell	25–7	12–2	1st	
1985–86	William Jewell	25–4	14–0	1st	
1986–87	William Jewell	27–6	14–0	1st	
1987–88	William Jewell	32–2	13–1	1st	NAIA Division I Elite Eight
1988–89	William Jewell	14–14	5–6		
1989–90	William Jewell	12–18	4–10		
1990–91	William Jewell	20–11	10–4	1st	
1991–92	William Jewell	23–13	9–3		NAIA Division II Elite Eight
1992–93	William Jewell	27–10	15–1	1st	NAIA Division II Final Four
1993–94	William Jewell	25–10	11–5		
1994–95	William Jewell	29–10	10–6		NAIA Division II Final Four
1995–96	William Jewell	30–9	10–6		
1996–97	William Jewell	29–10	14–4	1st	NAIA Division II Final Four
1997–98	William Jewell	28–9	16–2		NAIA Division II Sweet 16
1998–99	William Jewell	24–11	12–6		
1999–00	William Jewell	17–17	7–11		
2000–01	William Jewell	19–14	13–7		
2001–02	William Jewell	22–12	15–5		
2002–03	William Jewell	24–13	16–4		NAIA Division II Sweet 16
2003–04	William Jewell	33–5	18–2	1st	NAIA Division II Final Four
2004–05	William Jewell	31–6	17–3	1s	NAIA Division II Sweet 16
2005–06	William Jewell	27–8	16–4		NAIA Division II Sweet 16
2006–07	William Jewell	17–15	11–9		
2007–08	William Jewell	20–13	14–6		
2008–09	William Jewell	23–11	14–6	1st	NAIA Division I Sweet 16
2009–10	William Jewell	22–11	14–6		NAIA Division I First Round
2010–11	William Jewell	25–8	15–5		NAIA Division I First Round
William Jewell Cardinals (Great Lakes Valley Conference) (2011–2019)
2011–12	William Jewell	9–17	5–13	7th (West)	
2012–13	William Jewell	13–14	9–9	4th (West)	
2013–14	William Jewell	11–16	7–11	T–4th (West)	
2014–15	William Jewell	13–15	9–9	4th (West)	
2015–16	William Jewell	9–18	14–5	2nd (West)	
2016–17	William Jewell	9–18	4–14	T–6th (West)	
2017–18	William Jewell	20–9	10–8	3rd (West)	
2018–19	William Jewell	12–18	6–12	10th	
William Jewell:		832–460	455–227		
Total:		919–579			
National champion Postseason invitational champion Conference regular season champion Conference regular season and conference tournament champion Division regular season champion Division regular season and conference tournament champion Conference tournament champion

== See also ==
- List of college men's basketball career coaching wins leaders
