= Lock Springs, Missouri =

- Village
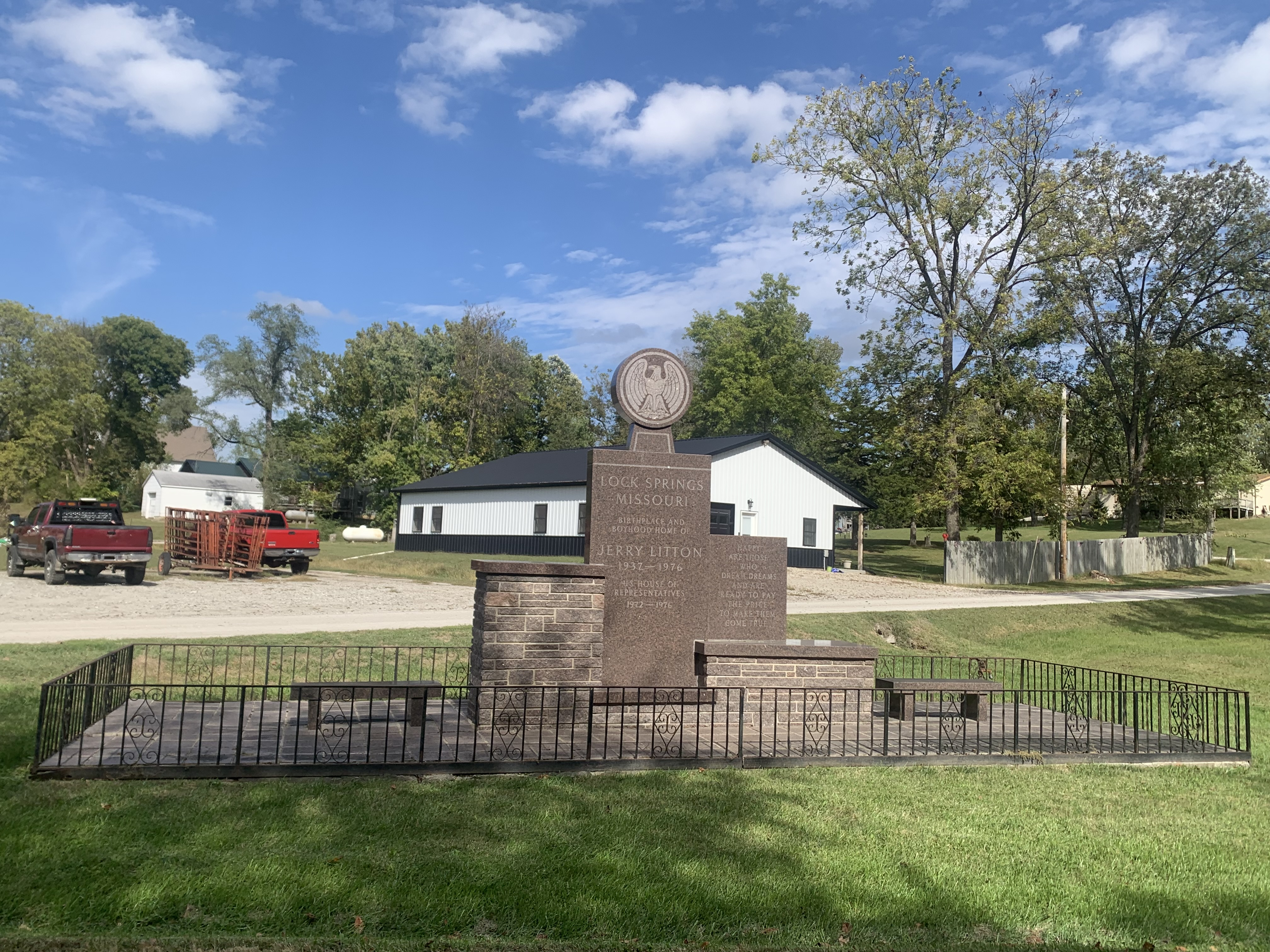
- Jerry Litton Memorial in Lock Springs

- Location of Lock Springs, Missouri
- Coordinates: 39°50′56″N 93°46′34″W
- Country: United States
- State: Missouri
- County: Daviess

Area
  - Total: 0.12 sq mi (0.32 km^{2})
  - Land: 0.12 sq mi (0.32 km^{2})
  - Water: 0 sq mi (0.00 km^{2})
- Elevation: 735 ft (224 m)

Population (2020)
  - Total: 40
  - Density: 323.4/sq mi (124.86/km^{2})
- Time zone: UTC-6 (Central (CST))
  - Summer (DST): UTC-5 (CDT)
- ZIP code: 64654
- Area code: 660
- FIPS code: 29-43472
- GNIS feature ID: 2398461

Lock Springs is a village in southeast Daviess County, Missouri, United States. The population was 40 at the 2020 census.

== Geography ==
Lock Springs is located on Missouri Route 190 approximately eight miles south of Jamesport. Chillicothe in adjacent Livingston County is approximately twelve miles to the east-southeast on Route 190. The Grand River flows past one mile to the southwest. Lock Springs was on the Wabash Railroad.

According to the United States Census Bureau, the village has a total area of 0.12 square miles (0.31 km^{2}), all land.

== Demographics ==
Historical population
Census	Pop.	Note	%±
1890	212		—
1900	246		16.0%
1910	255		3.7%
1920	288		12.9%
1930	209		−27.4%
1940	191		−8.6%
1950	137		−28.3%
1960	117		−14.6%
1970	85		−27.4%
1980	85		0.0%
1990	57		−32.9%
2000	69		21.1%
2010	57		−17.4%
2020	40		−29.8%
U.S. Decennial Census

=== 2010 census ===
As of the census of 2010, there were 57 people, 20 households, and 16 families living in the village. The population density was 475.0 inhabitants per square mile (183.4/km^{2}). There were 30 housing units at an average density of 250.0 per square mile (96.5/km^{2}). The racial makeup of the village was 100.0% White.

There were 20 households, of which 30.0% had children under the age of 18 living with them, 65.0% were married couples living together, 5.0% had a female householder with no husband present, 10.0% had a male householder with no wife present, and 20.0% were non-families. 15.0% of all households were made up of individuals, and 10% had someone living alone who was 65 years of age or older. The average household size was 2.85 and the average family size was 3.00.

The median age in the village was 34.3 years. 21.1% of residents were under the age of 18; 7.1% were between the ages of 18 and 24; 33.4% were from 25 to 44; 29.8% were from 45 to 64; and 8.8% were 65 years of age or older. The gender makeup of the village was 45.6% male and 54.4% female.

=== 2000 census ===
As of the census of 2000, there were 69 people, 25 households, and 17 families living in the village. The population density was 564.5 inhabitants per square mile (218.0/km^{2}). There were 31 housing units at an average density of 253.6 per square mile (97.9/km^{2}). The racial makeup of the village was 97.10% White, and 2.90% from two or more races.

There were 25 households, out of which 28.0% had children under the age of 18 living with them, 60.0% were married couples living together, 4.0% had a female householder with no husband present, and 32.0% were non-families. 24.0% of all households were made up of individuals, and 12.0% had someone living alone who was 65 years of age or older. The average household size was 2.76 and the average family size was 3.41.

In the village, the population was spread out, with 27.5% under the age of 18, 7.2% from 18 to 24, 29.0% from 25 to 44, 23.2% from 45 to 64, and 13.0% who were 65 years of age or older. The median age was 40 years. For every 100 females, there were 86.5 males. For every 100 females age 18 and over, there were 85.2 males.

The median income for a household in the village was $21,500, and the median income for a family was $21,500. Males had a median income of $34,583 versus $16,250 for females. The per capita income for the village was $10,816. There were 38.9% of families and 37.0% of the population living below the poverty line, including 48.1% of under eighteens and 21.4% of those over 64.

== Notable person ==
- Jerry Litton - Congressman who died in a plane crash on the night he won the 1976 Democratic primary for U.S. Senate.
