= Washington Township, Daviess County, Missouri =

Township in Daviess County, Missouri, U.S.

Washington Township
- Township
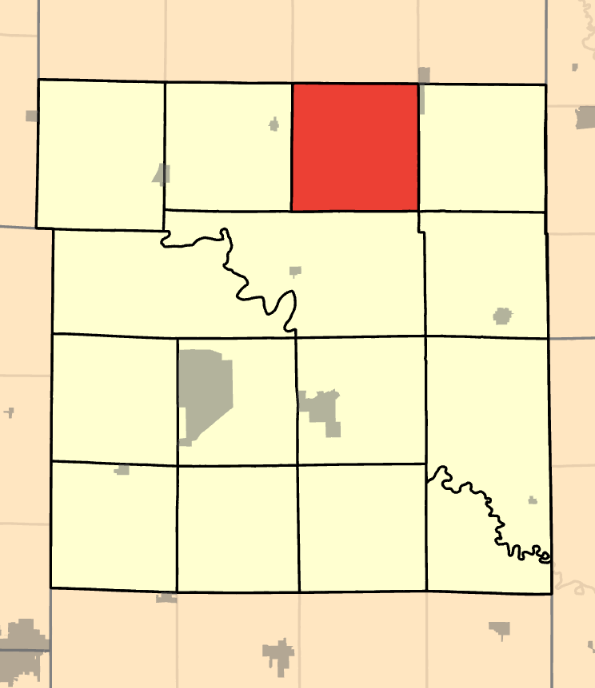
- Coordinates: 40°05′04″N 93°55′57″W
- Country: United States
- State: Missouri
- County: Daviess

Area
  - Total: 36.02 sq mi (93.3 km^{2})
  - Land: 35.89 sq mi (93.0 km^{2})
  - Water: 0.13 sq mi (0.34 km^{2}) 0.36%
- Elevation: 942 ft (287 m)

Population (2020)
  - Total: 149
  - Density: 4.2/sq mi (1.6/km^{2})
- FIPS code: 29-06177362
- GNIS feature ID: 766590

Washington Township is a township in Daviess County, Missouri, United States. At the 2020 census, its population was 149.
