= Winston, Missouri =

- Village
- Location of Winston, Missouri
- Coordinates: 39°52′12″N 94°08′30″W
- Country: United States
- State: Missouri
- County: Daviess

Area
  - Total: 0.31 sq mi (0.80 km^{2})
  - Land: 0.31 sq mi (0.80 km^{2})
  - Water: 0 sq mi (0.00 km^{2})
- Elevation: 1,053 ft (321 m)

Population (2020)
  - Total: 229
  - Density: 742.9/sq mi (286.85/km^{2})
- Time zone: UTC-6 (Central (CST))
  - Summer (DST): UTC-5 (CDT)
- ZIP code: 64689
- Area code: 660
- FIPS code: 29-80548
- GNIS feature ID: 2399723

Winston is a village in southwestern Daviess County, Missouri, United States. The population was 229 at the 2020 census.

== History ==
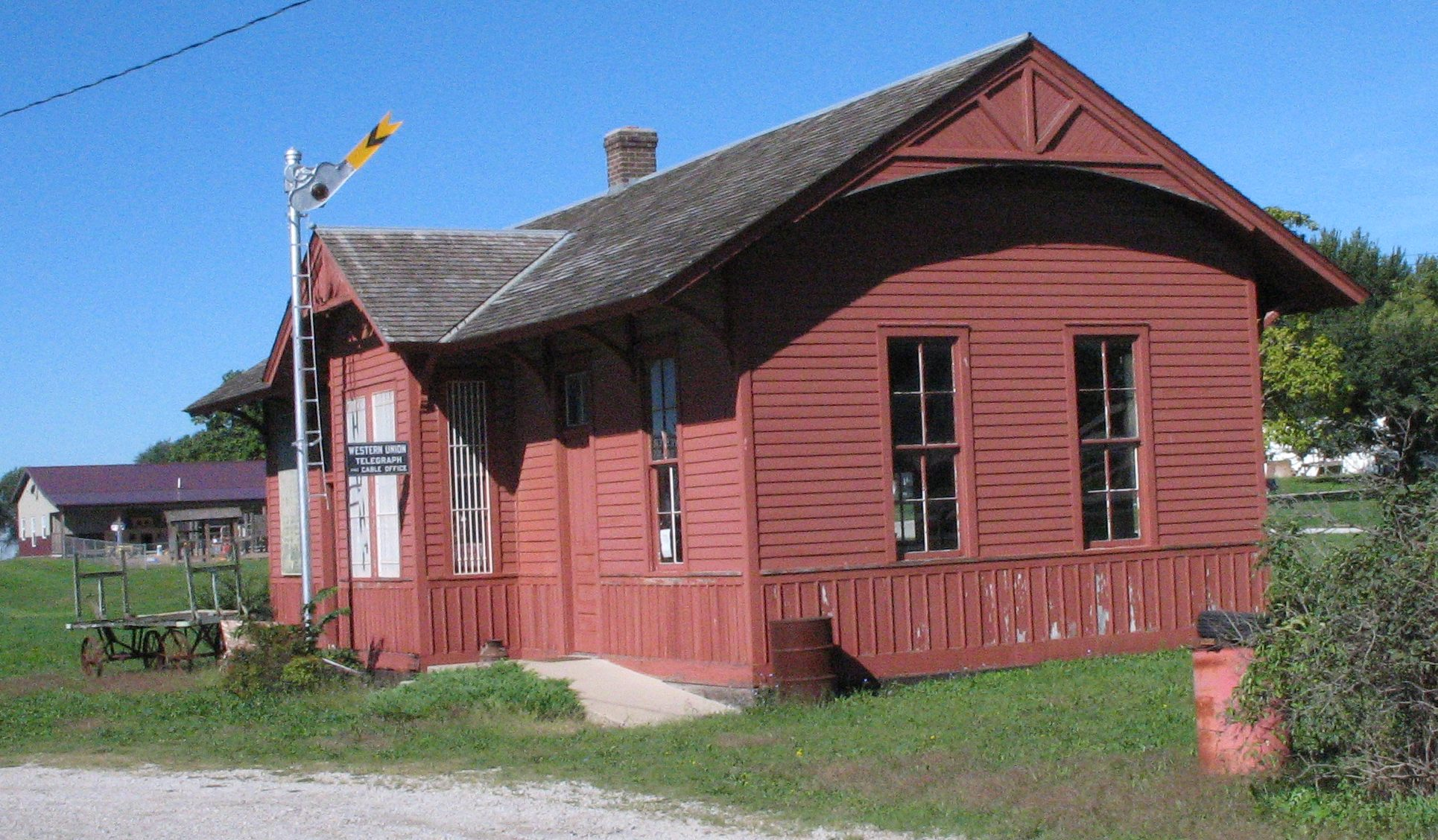
Rock Island Railroad depot that was allegedly robbed by the James-Younger Gang in which a clerk was killed. Frank James stood trial for the robbery and was acquitted in a highly publicized trial in nearby Gallatin.

Winston was originally called Crofton's Depot, and under the latter name was laid out in 1871 when the railroad was extended to that point. Other early variant names were "Winstonville" and "Emporia". The present name is after F. K. Winston, a railroad official. A post office called Winstonville was established in 1872, the name was changed to Emporia in 1879, and changed once more to Winston in 1885.

== Geography ==
Winston is located in southwest Daviess County on US Route 69. Gallatin is approximately ten miles to the east along Route 69 and Cameron is ten miles to the southwest in the northeastern corner of Clinton County.

According to the United States Census Bureau, the village has a total area of 0.31 square miles (0.80 km^{2}), all land.

=== Climate ===
Winston has a humid continental climate with very cold, snowy winters, and warm-to-hot, wet and humid summers in which much of the seasonal precipitation falls as thunderstorms. The hottest recorded temperature is 106 °F on August 19, 2003, while the record low temperature is −23 °F on December 23, 1989. Temperatures drop below freezing (32 °F) on an average of 100 days a year. Sub-zero Fahrenheit temperatures occur on average 7 days per year. Temperatures reach 90 °F or higher on an average of 24 days a year, and temperatures over 100 °F four days a year.

Climate data for Winston, Missouri
Month	Jan	Feb	Mar	Apr	May	Jun	Jul	Aug	Sep	Oct	Nov	Dec	Year
Record high °F (°C)	71 (22)	76 (24)	86 (30)	91 (33)	92 (33)	97 (36)	105 (41)	106 (41)	98 (37)	94 (34)	81 (27)	71 (22)	106 (41)
Mean daily maximum °F (°C)	34.9 (1.6)	40.2 (4.6)	52.1 (11.2)	63.3 (17.4)	72.8 (22.7)	82.0 (27.8)	86.4 (30.2)	85.4 (29.7)	77.2 (25.1)	65.4 (18.6)	51.2 (10.7)	37.6 (3.1)	62.4 (16.9)
Mean daily minimum °F (°C)	15.9 (−8.9)	19.7 (−6.8)	30.2 (−1.0)	40.8 (4.9)	51.6 (10.9)	61.3 (16.3)	66.0 (18.9)	63.9 (17.7)	54.2 (12.3)	42.2 (5.7)	31.0 (−0.6)	19.1 (−7.2)	41.3 (5.2)
Record low °F (°C)	−16 (−27)	−18 (−28)	−12 (−24)	17 (−8)	30 (−1)	42 (6)	51 (11)	44 (7)	32 (0)	21 (−6)	−4 (−20)	−23 (−31)	−23 (−31)
Average precipitation inches (mm)	1.11 (28)	1.16 (29)	2.61 (66)	3.49 (89)	4.82 (122)	4.22 (107)	4.25 (108)	3.78 (96)	4.42 (112)	3.14 (80)	2.42 (61)	1.59 (40)	37.01 (940)
Average snowfall inches (cm)	3.7 (9.4)	4.9 (12)	1.6 (4.1)	0.1 (0.25)	0 (0)	0 (0)	0 (0)	0 (0)	0 (0)	0 (0)	0.7 (1.8)	4.6 (12)	15.6 (40)
Source 1:
Source 2:

== Demographics ==
Historical population
Census	Pop.	Note	%±
1880	304		—
1890	470		54.6%
1900	457		−2.8%
1910	257		−43.8%
1920	339		31.9%
1930	314		−7.4%
1940	381		21.3%
1950	278		−27.0%
1960	236		−15.1%
1970	189		−19.9%
1980	246		30.2%
1990	251		2.0%
2000	247		−1.6%
2010	259		4.9%
2020	229		−11.6%
U.S. Decennial Census

=== 2010 census ===
As of the census of 2010, there were 259 people, 95 households, and 69 families living in the village. The population density was 835.5 inhabitants per square mile (322.6/km^{2}). There were 111 housing units at an average density of 358.1 per square mile (138.3/km^{2}). The racial makeup of the village was 97.3% White, 1.2% African American, 0.4% Native American, 0.8% from other races, and 0.4% from two or more races. Hispanic or Latino of any race were 0.8% of the population.

There were 95 households, of which 40.0% had children under the age of 18 living with them, 49.5% were married couples living together, 11.6% had a female householder with no husband present, 11.6% had a male householder with no wife present, and 27.4% were non-families. 24.2% of all households were made up of individuals, and 5.3% had someone living alone who was 65 years of age or older. The average household size was 2.73 and the average family size was 3.04.

The median age in the village was 35.5 years. 30.9% of residents were under the age of 18; 5.3% were between the ages of 18 and 24; 24.7% were from 25 to 44; 27.4% were from 45 to 64; and 11.6% were 65 years of age or older. The gender makeup of the village was 50.6% male and 49.4% female.

=== 2000 census ===
As of the census of 2000, there were 247 people, 97 households, and 67 families living in the village. The population density was 798.8 inhabitants per square mile (308.4/km^{2}). There were 111 housing units at an average density of 359.0 per square mile (138.6/km^{2}). The racial makeup of the village was 97.98% White and 2.02% Native American. Hispanic or Latino of any race were 1.62% of the population.

There were 97 households, out of which 32.0% had children under the age of 18 living with them, 53.6% were married couples living together, 14.4% had a female householder with no husband present, and 30.9% were non-families. 27.8% of all households were made up of individuals, and 13.4% had someone living alone who was 65 years of age or older. The average household size was 2.55 and the average family size was 3.06.

In the village, the population was spread out, with 27.5% under the age of 18, 11.3% from 18 to 24, 23.5% from 25 to 44, 25.5% from 45 to 64, and 12.1% who were 65 years of age or older. The median age was 37 years. For every 100 females, there were 79.0 males. For every 100 females age 18 and over, there were 79.0 males.

The median income for a household in the village was $30,125, and the median income for a family was $32,917. Males had a median income of $28,125 versus $19,375 for females. The per capita income for the village was $13,283. About 7.7% of families and 8.9% of the population were below the poverty line, including 8.5% of those under the age of eighteen and 7.1% of those 65 or over.

== Education ==
The school district is Winston R-VI School District.
