= Harrison Township, Daviess County, Missouri =

Township in Daviess County, Missouri, U.S.

Harrison Township
- Township
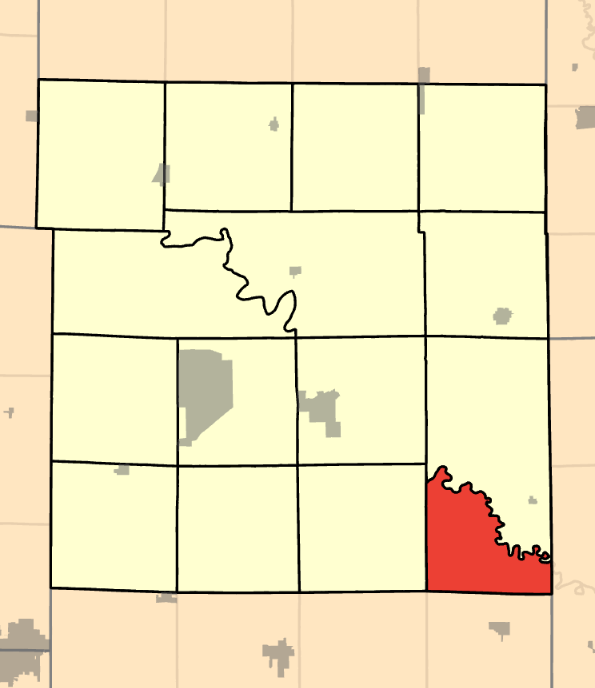
- Coordinates: 39°49′01″N 93°49′45″W
- Country: United States
- State: Missouri
- County: Daviess

Area
  - Total: 21.77 sq mi (56.4 km^{2})
  - Land: 21.57 sq mi (55.9 km^{2})
  - Water: 0.2 sq mi (0.52 km^{2}) 0.92%
- Elevation: 787 ft (240 m)

Population (2020)
  - Total: 143
  - Density: 6.6/sq mi (2.5/km^{2})
- FIPS code: 29-06130502
- GNIS feature ID: 766579

Harrison Township is a township in Daviess County, Missouri, United States. At the 2020 census, its population was 143.

Harrison Township has the name of William Henry Harrison, 9th President of the United States.
