= Bancroft, Missouri =

Extinct hamlet in Missouri, U.S.

Coordinates: 40°07′09″N 93°51′31″W

Bancroft is an extinct hamlet in northeast Daviess County, in the U.S. state of Missouri. The community is 1.5 miles south-southeast of Gilman City in southeastern Harrison County.

== History ==
Bancroft was laid out in 1859. A post office called Bancroft was established in 1867, and remained in operation until 1901. The establishment of Gilman in 1890 led to the dissolution of Bancroft.
