= Sheridan Township, Daviess County, Missouri =

Township in Daviess County, Missouri, U.S.

Sheridan Township
- Township
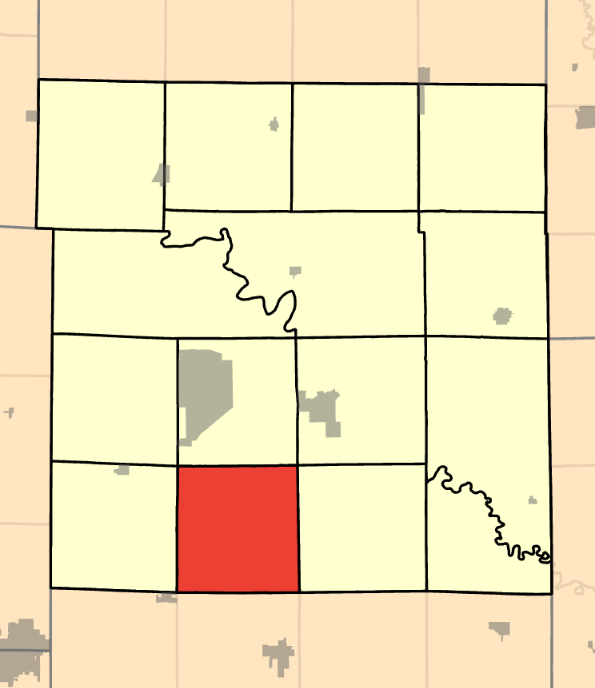
- Coordinates: 39°49′34″N 94°02′20″W
- Country: United States
- State: Missouri
- County: Daviess

Area
  - Total: 34.43 sq mi (89.2 km^{2})
  - Land: 34.14 sq mi (88.4 km^{2})
  - Water: 0.29 sq mi (0.75 km^{2}) 0.84%
- Elevation: 922 ft (281 m)

Population (2020)
  - Total: 444
  - Density: 13/sq mi (5.0/km^{2})
- FIPS code: 29-06167322
- GNIS feature ID: 766588

Sheridan Township is a township in Daviess County, Missouri, United States. At the 2020 census, its population was 444.

Sheridan Township was established in 1869, and most likely was named after Philip Sheridan, an officer in the Civil War.
