= Monroe Township, Daviess County, Missouri =

Township in Daviess County, Missouri, U.S.

Monroe Township
- Township
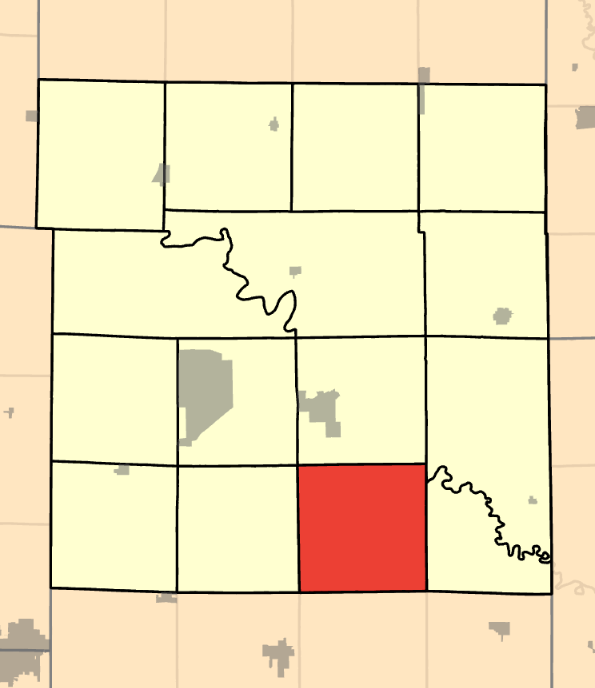
- Coordinates: 39°49′23″N 93°55′16″W
- Country: United States
- State: Missouri
- County: Daviess

Area
  - Total: 36.52 sq mi (94.6 km^{2})
  - Land: 36.24 sq mi (93.9 km^{2})
  - Water: 0.28 sq mi (0.73 km^{2}) 0.77%
- Elevation: 896 ft (273 m)

Population (2020)
  - Total: 209
  - Density: 5.8/sq mi (2.2/km^{2})
- FIPS code: 29-06149304
- GNIS feature ID: 766586

Monroe Township is a township in Daviess County, Missouri, United States. At the 2020 census, its population was 209.

The township is named after President James Monroe.
