= Colfax Township, Daviess County, Missouri =

Township in Daviess County, Missouri, U.S.

Colfax Township
- Township
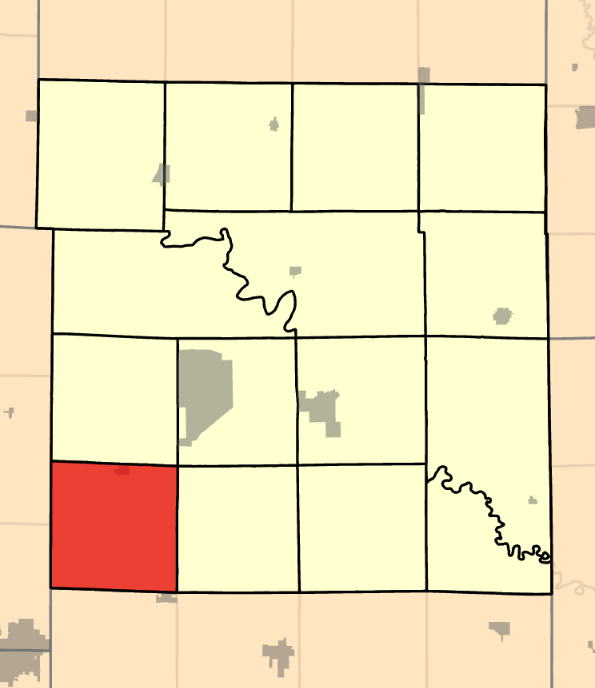
- Coordinates: 39°49′26″N 94°09′29″W
- Country: United States
- State: Missouri
- County: Daviess

Area
  - Total: 35.88 sq mi (92.9 km^{2})
  - Land: 35.54 sq mi (92.0 km^{2})
  - Water: 0.34 sq mi (0.88 km^{2}) 0.95%
- Elevation: 1,001 ft (305 m)

Population (2020)
  - Total: 617
  - Density: 17.4/sq mi (6.7/km^{2})
- FIPS code: 29-06115472
- GNIS feature ID: 766577

Colfax Township is a township in Daviess County, Missouri, United States. At the 2020 census, its population was 617.

Colfax Township has the name of Schuyler Colfax, 17th Vice President of the United States.
