= Marion Township, Daviess County, Missouri =

Township in Daviess County, Missouri, U.S.

Marion Township
- Township
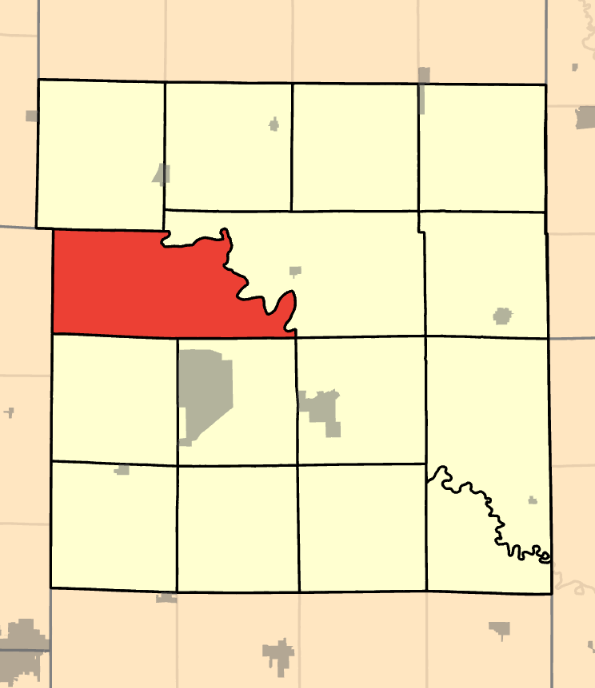
- Coordinates: 39°59′35″N 94°06′39″W
- Country: United States
- State: Missouri
- County: Daviess

Area
  - Total: 46.36 sq mi (120.1 km^{2})
  - Land: 45.87 sq mi (118.8 km^{2})
  - Water: 0.49 sq mi (1.3 km^{2}) 1.06%
- Elevation: 912 ft (278 m)

Population (2020)
  - Total: 253
  - Density: 5.5/sq mi (2.1/km^{2})
- FIPS code: 29-06146010
- GNIS feature ID: 766585

Marion Township is a township in Daviess County, Missouri, United States. At the 2020 census, its population was 253.

Marion Township was established in 1869, and most likely was named after Francis Marion, an officer in the Revolutionary War.
