= Mabel, Missouri =

Unincorporated community in Missouri, U.S.

Coordinates: 39°49′18″N 94°12′00″W

Mabel is an unincorporated community in southwest Daviess County, in the U.S. state of Missouri.

The community is located adjacent to U.S. Route 69 about one-quarter mile (0.40 km) east of the Daviess-DeKalb county line and two miles (3.2 km) north of the Davies-Caldwell county line. Cameron is six miles to the south-southwest along Route 69.

== History ==
A post office called Mabel was established in 1883, and remained in operation until 1936. The origin or namesake of the name Mabel is uncertain.
