= Civil Bend, Missouri =

Extinct hamlet in Daviess County, Missouri

Coordinates: 39°59′50″N 94°06′01″W

Civil Bend is an extinct hamlet in western Daviess County, in the U.S. state of Missouri.

The community was located on Missouri Route DD just west of I-35. Pattonsburg is approximately four miles to the north-northwest.

== History ==
Civil Bend was platted in 1868, taking its name from a nearby meander of the same name on the Grand River. A post office called Civil Bend was established in 1862, and remained in operation until 1906. The population at the beginning of the 20th Century was about 100.
