= Jamesport, Missouri =

- City
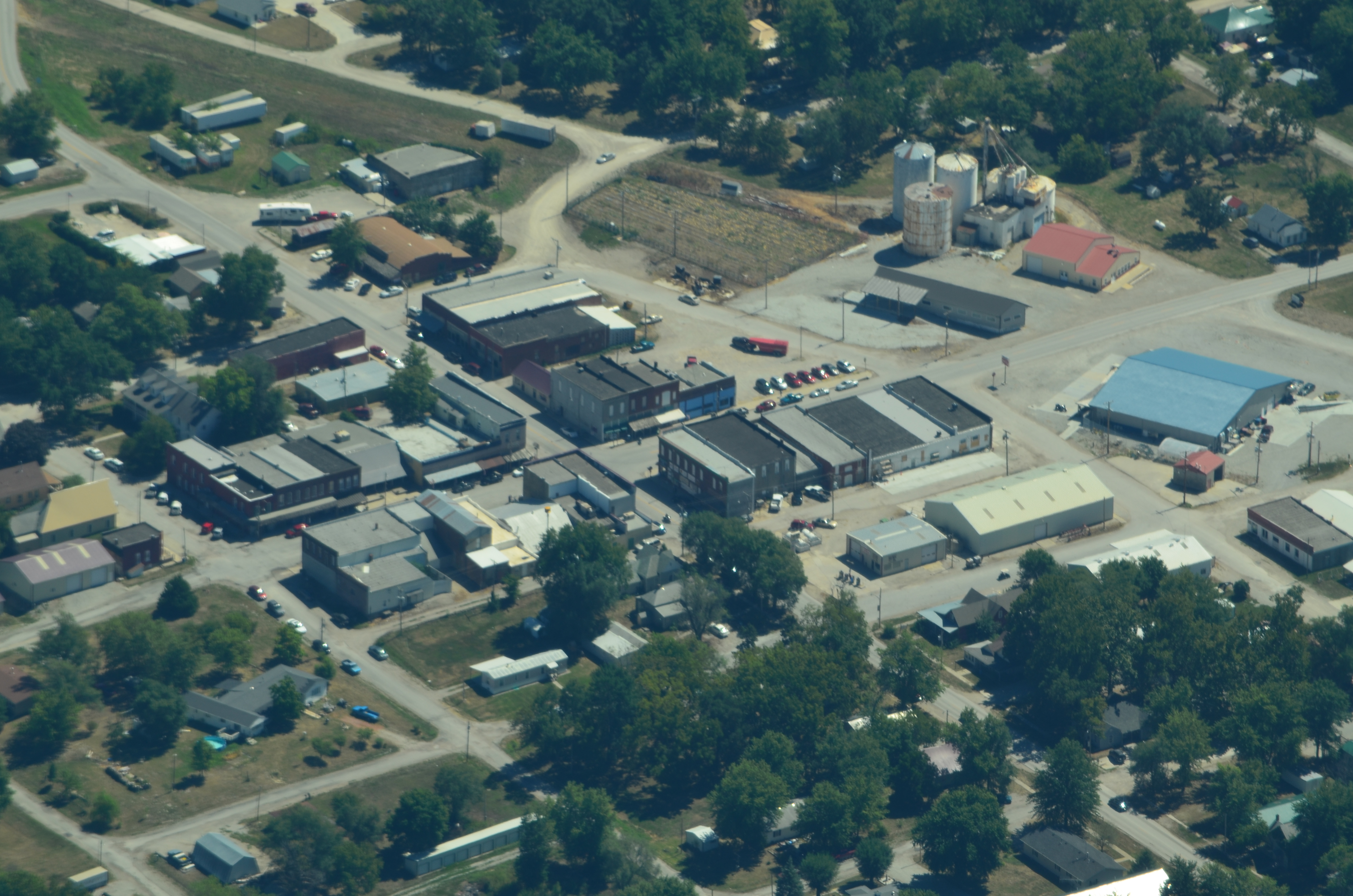
- Aerial view of Jamesport, Missouri

- Location of Jamesport, Missouri
- Coordinates: 39°58′30″N 93°48′11″W
- Country: United States
- State: Missouri
- County: Daviess

Area
  - Total: 0.56 sq mi (1.46 km^{2})
  - Land: 0.56 sq mi (1.45 km^{2})
  - Water: 0 sq mi (0.00 km^{2})
- Elevation: 984 ft (300 m)

Population (2020)
  - Total: 559
  - Density: 995.6/sq mi (384.39/km^{2})
- Time zone: UTC-6 (Central (CST))
  - Summer (DST): UTC-5 (CDT)
- ZIP code: 64648
- Area code: 660 Exchange: 684
- FIPS code: 29-36332
- GNIS feature ID: 2395453

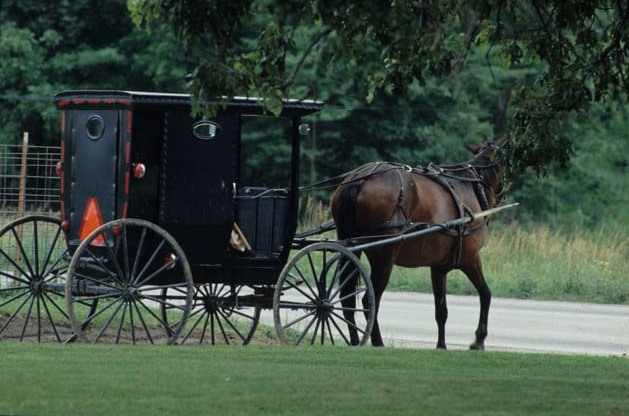
Amish horse and buggy in Jamesport

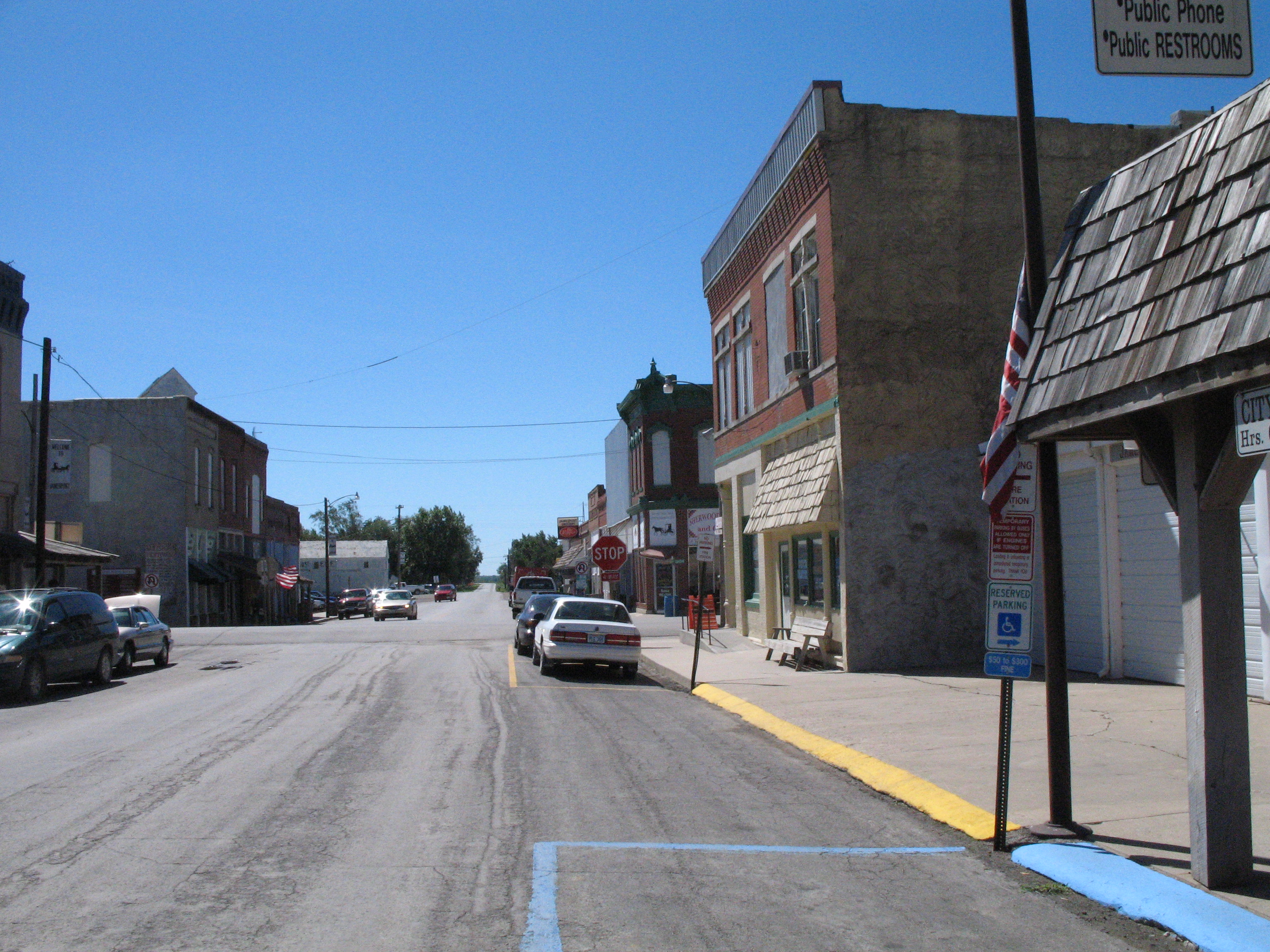
Main Street of Jamesport

Jamesport is a city in eastern Daviess County, Missouri, United States. The population was 559 at the 2020 census.

== History ==
A post office called Jamesport has been in operation since 1857. The community's name honors two first settlers with the given name James, namely James Gillilan and James Allen.

Jamesport has the largest Amish community in the state of Missouri.

== Geography ==
Jamesport is located in eastern Daviess County on Missouri Route 190 just south of Missouri Route 6. Gallatin is approximately nine miles to the southwest and Trenton is approximately 12 miles to the northeast in adjacent Grundy County.

According to the United States Census Bureau, the city has a total area of 0.56 square miles (1.45 km^{2}), all land.

== Demographics ==
Historical population
Census	Pop.	Note	%±
1860	59		—
1870	55		−6.8%
1880	608		1,005.5%
1890	790		29.9%
1900	728		−7.8%
1910	611		−16.1%
1920	884		44.7%
1930	839		−5.1%
1940	761		−9.3%
1950	720		−5.4%
1960	622		−13.6%
1970	614		−1.3%
1980	651		6.0%
1990	570		−12.4%
2000	505		−11.4%
2010	524		3.8%
2020	559		6.7%
U.S. Decennial Census

=== 2010 census ===
As of the census of 2010, there were 524 people, 230 households, and 145 families living in the city. The population density was 935.7 inhabitants per square mile (361.3/km^{2}). There were 308 housing units at an average density of 550.0 per square mile (212.4/km^{2}). The racial makeup of the city was 96.0% White, 0.2% Native American, 0.4% Asian, and 3.4% from two or more races. Hispanic or Latino of any race were 0.6% of the population.

There were 230 households, of which 31.7% had children under the age of 18 living with them, 40.0% were married couples living together, 16.5% had a female householder with no husband present, 6.5% had a male householder with no wife present, and 37.0% were non-families. 32.2% of all households were made up of individuals, and 14.4% had someone living alone who was 65 years of age or older. The average household size was 2.28 and the average family size was 2.87.

The median age in the city was 38.4 years. 27.5% of residents were under the age of 18; 8.7% were between the ages of 18 and 24; 21% were from 25 to 44; 25.8% were from 45 to 64; and 17% were 65 years of age or older. The gender makeup of the city was 47.5% male and 52.5% female.

=== 2000 census ===
As of the Census of 2000, there were 505 people, 211 households, and 140 families living in the city. The population density was 895.0 inhabitants per square mile (345.6/km^{2}). There were 258 housing units at an average density of 457.2 per square mile (176.5/km^{2}). The racial makeup of the city was 99.01% White, 0.59% Native American, and 0.40% from two or more races. Hispanic or Latino of any race were 1.78% of the population.

There were 211 households, out of which 25.1% had children under the age of 18 living with them, 52.1% were married couples living together, 10.9% had a female householder with no husband present, and 33.6% were non-families. 29.9% of all households were made up of individuals, and 15.2% had someone living alone who was 65 years of age or older. The average household size was 2.39 and the average family size was 2.94.

In the city the population was spread out, with 23.6% under the age of 18, 10.1% from 18 to 24, 21.2% from 25 to 44, 25.3% from 45 to 64, and 19.8% who were 65 years of age or older. The median age was 41 years. For every 100 females, there were 92.0 males. For every 100 females age 18 and over, there were 84.7 males.

The median income for a household in the city was $29,265, and the median income for a family was $30,556. Males had a median income of $38,438 versus $28,167 for females. The per capita income for the city was $12,447. About 22.2% of families and 27.1% of the population were below the poverty line, including 29.1% of those under age 18 and 40.2% of those age 65 or over.

== Education ==
Public education from kindergarten through 12th grade is provided by the Tri-County R-VII School District. K-6 is located at Tri-County Elementary School, and 7-12 is located at Tri-County High School. There are also five private schools in the area. The Jamesport Mennonite School provides education for 1st through 8th grades. The seven Amish schools in the area include Spring Hill, Country View, Hickory Hill (1–8), Meadow View (1–7), Oak Grove (1–8), and Walnut Creek (1–8), and Special Education School. There is also a New Order Amish School, Faith View School.

Jamesport has a lending library, a branch of the Daviess County Library.

== Media ==
Jamesport is served by a weekly newspaper, the Tri-County Weekly, which has been in circulation since 1944.

== Notable people ==
- Phog Allen - University of Kansas coach called the "Father of Basketball Coaching"
- Martha Scott - Academy Award nominated actress
