= Fordham, Missouri =

Extinct hamlet in Missouri, U.S.

Coordinates: 39°49′48″N 94°16′14″W

Fordham is an extinct hamlet in southeast DeKalb County, in the U.S. state of Missouri.

The community is located above the west bank of Grindstone Creek approximately six miles southeast of Maysville and six miles northwest of Cameron in the northeast corner of adjacent Clinton County.

== History ==
A post office called Fordham was established in 1906, and remained in operation until 1909. The community was named after one Mr. Ford, who headed a church in the Illinois city where an early settler once had lived.
