= Jamesport Township, Daviess County, Missouri =

Township in Daviess County, Missouri, U.S.

Jamesport Township
- Township
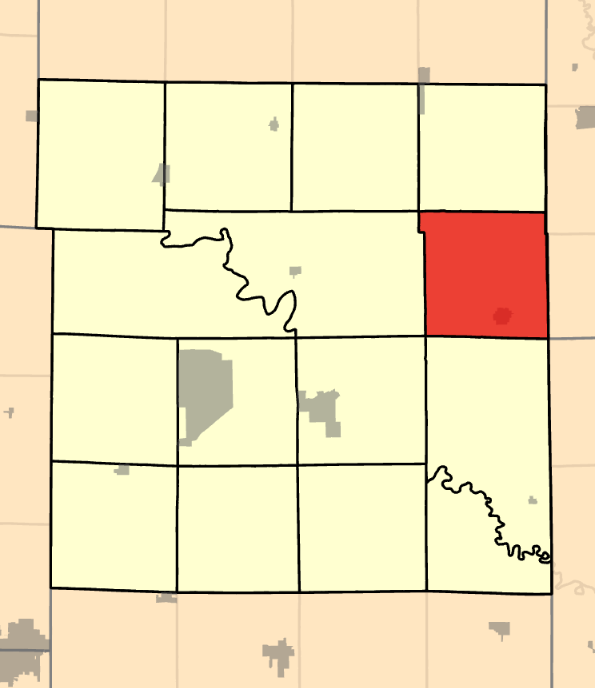
- Coordinates: 40°00′11″N 93°48′44″W
- Country: United States
- State: Missouri
- County: Daviess

Area
  - Total: 34.49 sq mi (89.3 km^{2})
  - Land: 34.28 sq mi (88.8 km^{2})
  - Water: 0.21 sq mi (0.54 km^{2}) 0.61%
- Elevation: 879 ft (268 m)

Population (2020)
  - Total: 1,096
  - Density: 32/sq mi (12/km^{2})
- FIPS code: 29-06136350
- GNIS feature ID: 766581

Jamesport Township is a township in Daviess County, Missouri, United States. At the 2020 census, its population was 1,096.

Jamesport Township was established in 1870 and its original name was Grant Township.
