= Edinburg, Missouri =

- Census-designated place
- Location within Missouri Location within the United States
- Coordinates: 40°4′52″N 93°41′23″W
- Country: United States
- State: Missouri
- County: Grundy

Area
  - Total: 1.07 sq mi (2.78 km^{2})
  - Land: 1.07 sq mi (2.78 km^{2})
  - Water: 0 sq mi (0.00 km^{2})
- Elevation: 955 ft (291 m)

Population (2020)
  - Total: 84
  - Density: 78.3/sq mi (30.24/km^{2})
- Time zone: UTC-6 (Central (CST))
  - Summer (DST): UTC-5 (CDT)
- FIPS code: 29-21340
- GNIS feature ID: 2587066

Edinburg (also Edinburgh) is an unincorporated community and census-designated place (CDP) in Grundy County, Missouri, United States, 5 miles (8 km) west of Trenton. As of the 2020 census, Edinburg had a population of 84.

== History ==
The hamlet was the first in Grundy County and was called "Buck Snort" in 1838 when Grundy County's first white settler William Preston Thompson established his house. A home of Thompson, for whom the Thompson Branch of the Grand River is named, is in nearby Crowder State Park.

A post office called Edinburg was established in 1857, and remained in operation until 1907. It is named for the Scottish city of Edinburgh.

Edinburg was home to Grand River College from 1850 until 1892 when it moved to Gallatin, Missouri, where it operated for a period under the auspices of William Jewell College before permanently closing in 1910 following a fire.

It is the birthplace of Major General Enoch Crowder of the United States Army, founder of the United States Selective Service in World War I.

== Demographics ==
Historical population
Census	Pop.	Note	%±
2020	84		—
U.S. Decennial Census
