= Daviess County, Missouri =

County in Missouri, United States

- County
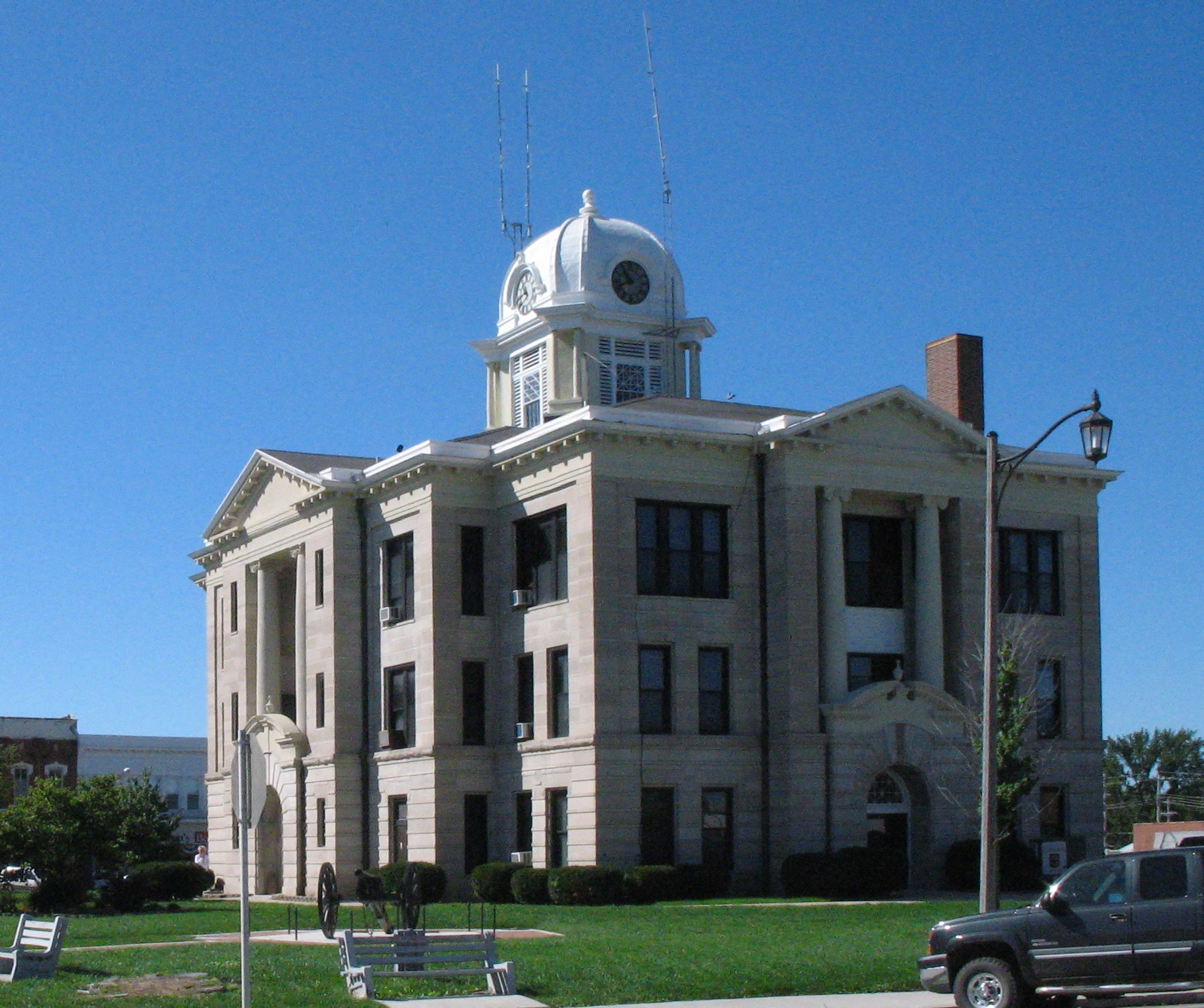
- Daviess County Courthouse in Gallatin

- Location within the U.S. state of Missouri
- Coordinates: 39°58′N 93°59′W
- Country: United States
- State: Missouri
- Founded: December 29, 1836
- Named for: Major Joseph Hamilton Daviess
- Seat: Gallatin
- Largest city: Gallatin

Area
  - Total: 569 sq mi (1,470 km^{2})
  - Land: 563 sq mi (1,460 km^{2})
  - Water: 5.8 sq mi (15 km^{2}) 1.0%

Population (2020)
  - Total: 8,430
  - Estimate (2025): 8,558 ▲
  - Density: 15.2/sq mi (5.9/km^{2})
- Time zone: UTC−6 (Central)
  - Summer (DST): UTC−5 (CDT)
- Congressional district: 6th
- Website: www.daviesscountymo.gov

Daviess County (/ˈdeɪvɪs/ DAY-viss) is a county located in the U.S. state of Missouri. As of the 2020 census, the population was 8,430. Its county seat is Gallatin. The county was organized December 29, 1836, from Ray County and named for Major Joseph Hamilton Daveiss, a soldier from Kentucky who was killed in 1811 at the Battle of Tippecanoe.

The county includes the town of Jamesport, which has the largest Amish community in Missouri.

== History ==
Latter Day Saint movement founder Joseph Smith taught that Adam-ondi-Ahman, in the central part of the county, was where Adam and Eve moved after being banished from the Garden of Eden. According to LDS tradition, the site is to be a gathering spot before the Second Coming of Jesus Christ.

In 1838, two years after the county was organized, Smith's claims about the area drew an influx of Mormon settlers. Non-Mormon residents feared they were going to lose control of the county and attempted to prevent Mormons from voting in the Gallatin Election Day Battle—the first skirmish in the Mormon War. Later, in retaliation for violence to their families and destruction of their property, some Mormons burned and sacked Gallatin, Grindstone Fork, Millport and other smaller settlements. The plundered goods were deposited in the Bishop's storehouse at Diahman. Millport, which at the time was the largest city in the county and the center for trade, never recovered, and became a ghost town. Missouri Governor Lilburn Boggs issued an Extermination Order to drive the Mormons from the state after arresting Joseph Smith and other leaders of the church.

Daviess County played a major role in the history of the outlaw James-Younger Gang. The first confirmed bank robbery involving Jesse James occurred on December 7, 1869, at the Daviess County Savings Association in Gallatin. During the robbery, James killed cashier John W. Sheets, whom he believed was Samuel P. Cox, who had killed James's bushwhacker colleague Bloody Bill Anderson during the American Civil War. The gang is also believed responsible for the July 15, 1881, robbery of the Rock Island Line at Winston in which a conductor and passenger were killed.

After Jesse James was murdered in St. Joseph, Frank James surrendered in 1882 to face Daviess County charges in connection with the train robbery/murder and murder charges in the 1869 bank robbery. His trial lasted from August 20 until September 6, 1883. Interest was so intense that the trial was moved to the Gallatin Opera House to accommodate the crowds. James was found not guilty of involvement in both crimes. Charges were made that the jury was filled with Southern sympathizers who refused to convict one of their own.

The Daviess County Savings Association and the Gallatin Opera House have since been torn down, although the Winston Rock Island Line train station still stands and is operated by the local historical society as a museum.

Daviess County has one of only three Rotary Jails still in existence. Also known as the "Squirrel Cage Jail," it is now a museum and is on the National Register of Historic Places.

== Geography ==
According to the U.S. Census Bureau, the county has a total area of 569 square miles (1,470 km^{2}), of which 563 square miles (1,460 km^{2}) is land and 5.8 square miles (15 km^{2}) (1.0%) is water.

=== Adjacent counties ===
- Harrison County (north)
- Grundy County (northeast)
- Livingston County (southeast)
- Caldwell County (south)
- DeKalb County (west)
- Gentry County (northwest)

=== Major highways ===
- Interstate 35
- U.S. Route 69
- Route 6
- Route 13
- Route 190

== Demographics ==
Historical population
Census	Pop.	Note	%±
1840	2,736		—
1850	5,298		93.6%
1860	9,606		81.3%
1870	14,410		50.0%
1880	19,145		32.9%
1890	20,456		6.8%
1900	21,325		4.2%
1910	17,605		−17.4%
1920	16,641		−5.5%
1930	14,424		−13.3%
1940	13,398		−7.1%
1950	11,180		−16.6%
1960	9,502		−15.0%
1970	8,420		−11.4%
1980	8,905		5.8%
1990	7,865		−11.7%
2000	8,016		1.9%
2010	8,433		5.2%
2020	8,430		0.0%
2025 (est.)	8,558	▲	1.5%
U.S. Decennial Census:

=== 2020 census ===
As of the 2020 census, the county had a population of 8,430 residents. The median age was 40.6 years, with 25.8% of residents under the age of 18 and 20.5% aged 65 or older. For every 100 females there were 97.8 males, and for every 100 females age 18 and over there were 96.0 males age 18 and over.

The racial makeup of the county was 94.6% White, 0.4% Black or African American, 0.3% American Indian and Alaska Native, 0.2% Asian, 0.1% Native Hawaiian and Pacific Islander, 0.3% from some other race, and 4.0% from two or more races. Hispanic or Latino residents of any race comprised 1.3% of the population.

0.0% of residents lived in urban areas, while 100.0% lived in rural areas.

There were 3,233 households in the county, of which 30.3% had children under the age of 18 living with them and 21.3% had a female householder with no spouse or partner present. About 28.0% of all households were made up of individuals and 14.1% had someone living alone who was 65 years of age or older.

There were 4,123 housing units, of which 21.6% were vacant. Among occupied housing units, 76.8% were owner-occupied and 23.2% were renter-occupied. The homeowner vacancy rate was 2.6% and the rental vacancy rate was 10.7%.

=== Racial and ethnic composition ===
The county's racial and ethnic composition from 1980 through 2020 is detailed below.

Daviess County, Missouri – Racial and ethnic composition Note: the US Census treats Hispanic/Latino as an ethnic category. This table excludes Latinos from the racial categories and assigns them to a separate category. Hispanics/Latinos may be of any race.
Race / Ethnicity (NH = Non-Hispanic)	Pop 1980	Pop 1990	Pop 2000	Pop 2010	Pop 2020	% 1980	% 1990	% 2000	% 2010	% 2020
White alone (NH)	8,832	7,781	7,877	8,211	7,924	99.18%	98.93%	98.27%	97.37%	94.00%
Black or African American alone (NH)	6	2	4	23	31	0.07%	0.03%	0.05%	0.27%	0.37%
Native American or Alaska Native alone (NH)	10	24	28	23	27	0.11%	0.31%	0.35%	0.27%	0.32%
Asian alone (NH)	5	12	6	5	16	0.06%	0.15%	0.07%	0.06%	0.19%
Native Hawaiian or Pacific Islander alone (NH)	x	x	15	2	10	x	x	0.19%	0.02%	0.12%
Other race alone (NH)	6	0	0	0	7	0.07%	0.00%	0.00%	0.00%	0.08%
Mixed race or Multiracial (NH)	x	x	31	82	302	x	x	0.39%	0.97%	3.58%
Hispanic or Latino (any race)	46	46	55	87	113	0.52%	0.58%	0.69%	1.03%	1.34%
Total	8,905	7,865	8,016	8,433	8,430	100.00%	100.00%	100.00%	100.00%	100.00%

=== 2010 census ===
As of the 2010 census, there were 8,433 people, 3,214 households, and 2,489 families residing in the county. The population density was 15 people per square mile (5.8 people/km^{2}). There were 4,199 housing units at an average density of 7 units per square mile (2.7/km^{2}). The racial makeup of the county was 98.02% White, 0.27% Black or African American, 0.38% Native American, 0.06% Asian, 0.02% Pacific Islander, 0.08% from other races, and 1.16% from two or more races. Approximately 1.03% of the population were Hispanic or Latino of any race.

There were 3,214 households, out of which 31.92% had children under the age of 18 living with them, 58.81% were married couples living together, 8.06% had a female householder with no husband present, and 28.34% were non-families. 24.64% of all households were made up of individuals, and 10.89% had someone living alone who was 65 years of age or older. The average household size was 2.58 and the average family size was 3.06.

In the county, the population was spread out, with 26.70% under the age of 18, 7.02% from 18 to 24, 21.81% from 25 to 44, 27.38% from 45 to 64, and 17.09% who were 65 years of age or older. The median age was 40 years. For every 100 females there were 98.80 males. For every 100 females age 18 and over, there were 98.30 males.

The median income for a household in the county was $39,925, and the median income for a family was $48,839. Males had a median income of $33,882 versus $28,891 for females. The per capita income for the county was $19,900. About 9.80% of families and 13.80% of the population were below the poverty line, including 18.50% of those under age 18 and 11.60% of those age 65 or over.

== Religion ==
Religion in Daviess County, according to ARDA (2020)
1. Evangelicals Churches (32.4%)
2. Mainline Protestants Churches (12.7%)
3. Anabaptist Churches (Amish and Mennonite) (11.5%)
4. LDS Church (7.00%)
5. Catholic Church (1.20%)
6. None (35.1%)

== Education ==
Of adults 25 years of age and older in Daviess County, 84.0% possess a high school diploma or higher, while 14.4% hold a bachelor's degree or higher as their highest educational attainment.

School districts in the county include:

- Breckenridge R-I School District
- Cameron R-I School District
- Gallatin R-V School District
- Gilman City R-IV School District
- Hamilton R-II School District
- North Daviess R-III School District
- Pattonsburg R-II School District
- South Harrison County R-II School District
- Trenton R-IX School District
- Tri-County R-VII School District
- Winston R-VI School District

=== Public schools ===
- Gallatin R-V School District - Gallatin
  - Covel D. Searcy Elementary School (PK-04)
  - Gallatin Middle School (05-08)
  - Gallatin High School (09-12)
- North Daviess County R-III School District - Jameson
  - North Daviess County Elementary School (PK-06) - Jameson
  - North Daviess County High School (07-12) - Jameson
- Pattonsburg R-II School District - Pattonsburg
  - Pattonsburg Elementary School (PK-06)
  - Pattonsburg High School (07-12)
- Tri-County R-VII School District - Jamesport
  - Tri-County Elementary School (K-06)
  - Tri-County High School (07-12)
- Winston R-VI School District - Winston
  - Winston Elementary School (PK-06)
  - Winston High School (07-12)

=== Private schools ===
- Country View School - Jamesport - (01-08) - Amish
- Hickory Hill School - Jamesport - (01-08) - Amish
- Jamesport Mennonite School - Jamesport - (01-08) - Mennonite
- Meadow View School - Jamesport - (01-07) Amish
- Oak Grove School - Jamesport - (01-08) - Amish
- Spring Hill School - Jamesport - (01-08) - Amish
- Walnut Creek School - Jamesport - (01-08) - Amish

=== Public libraries ===
- Daviess County Library

== Communities ==
=== Cities ===
- Coffey
- Gallatin (county seat)
- Gilman City
- Jamesport
- Pattonsburg

=== Villages ===
- Altamont
- Jameson
- Lock Springs
- Winston

=== Census-designated place ===
- Lake Viking

=== Unincorporated communities ===
- Alta Vista
- Bancroft
- Carlow
- Civil Bend
- Mabel
- Old Pattonsburg

=== Townships ===
- Benton
- Colfax
- Grand River
- Harrison
- Jackson
- Jamesport
- Jefferson
- Liberty
- Lincoln
- Marion
- Monroe
- Salem
- Sheridan
- Union
- Washington

== Notable people ==
- Phog Allen - University of Kansas coach, called the "Father of Basketball Coaching."
- Conrad Burns - U.S. Senator (R-Montana), (1989-2007)
- Webster Davis - Mayor of Kansas City, (1894-1895)
- Alexander Monroe Dockery - Governor of Missouri, (1901-1905)
- Brice Garnett - Professional golfer
- Larry Holley - Head men's basketball coach at William Jewell College
- William Thornton Kemper Sr. - Patriarch of the Missouri Kemper financial family
- Jerry Litton - U.S. Representative, (1973-1976)
- Johnny Ringo - outlaw who briefly lived in the area
- Martha Scott - Academy Award-nominated actress
- Wild Bill Elliott - Hollywood western movie actor, best known for role as "Red Ryder"

== Politics ==
=== Local ===
Politics are predominantly controlled by the Republican Party at the local level in Daviess County.

Daviess County, Missouri

Elected countywide officials
Assessor	Aaron Piburn	Republican
Circuit Clerk	Sandy Dustman	Republican
County Clerk	Rachel Taylor	Republican
Collector	Lacey Corwin	Republican
Commissioner (presiding)	Jim Ruse	Republican
Commissioner (district 1)	David Cox	Republican
Commissioner (district 2)	Wayne Uthe	Republican
Coroner	Jason Smith	Republican
Prosecuting Attorney	Andrea (Annie) Gibson	Democratic
Public Administrator	Tammy Huffman	Republican
Recorder	Tiffany Tadlock	Republican
Sheriff	Larry Adams	Republican
Treasurer	Lacey Corwin	Republican

=== State ===
Past Gubernatorial Elections Results
Year	Republican	Democratic	Third Parties
2024	78.96% 3,074	18.39% 716	2.65% 103
2020	77.21% 2,975	20.11% 775	2.67% 103
2016	61.65% 2,300	34.87% 1,301	3.48% 130
2012	48.28% 1,697	48.11% 1,691	3.61% 127
2008	44.81% 1,683	52.42% 1,969	2.77% 104
2004	55.52% 2,091	42.96% 1,618	1.51% 57
2000	50.91% 1,768	46.18% 1,604	2.90% 101

All of Daviess County is a part of Missouri's 2nd District in the Missouri House of Representatives and is currently represented by J. Eggleston (R-Maysville). Eggleston was reelected to a fourth term in 2020.

Missouri House of Representatives – District 2 – Daviess County (2020)
Party	Candidate	Votes	%	±%
Republican	J. Eggleston	3,087	81.86%	−16.83
Democratic	Mindi Smith	684	18.14%	+18.14

Missouri House of Representatives – District 2 – Daviess County (2018)
Party	Candidate	Votes	%	±%
Republican	J. Eggleston	2,633	98.69%	−1.31
	Write-ins	35	1.31%	

All of Daviess County is a part of Missouri's 12th District in the Missouri Senate and is currently represented by Dan Hegeman (R-Cosby). Hegeman won a second term in 2018.

Missouri Senate – District 12 – Daviess County (2018)
Party	Candidate	Votes	%	±%
Republican	Dan Hegeman	2,216	75.37%	−24.63
Democratic	Terry Richard	723	24.59%	+24.59%
	Write-ins	1	0.03%%	

Missouri Senate – District 12 – Daviess County (2014)
Party	Candidate	Votes	%	±%
Republican	Dan Hegeman	1,460	100.00%	

=== Federal ===
All of Daviess County is included in Missouri's 6th Congressional District and is currently represented by Sam Graves (R-Tarkio) in the U.S. House of Representatives. Graves was elected to an eleventh term in 2020 over Democratic challenger Gena Ross.

U.S. House of Representatives – Missouri’s 6th Congressional District – Daviess County (2020)
Party	Candidate	Votes	%	±%
Republican	Sam Graves	3,098	81.25%	+3.91
Democratic	Gena L. Ross	633	16.60%	−2.96
Libertarian	Jim Higgins	82	2.15%	−0.92

U.S. House of Representatives – Missouri's 6th Congressional District – Daviess County (2018)
Party	Candidate	Votes	%	±%
Republican	Sam Graves	2,321	77.34%	+0.83
Democratic	Henry Robert Martin	587	19.56%	−0.48
Libertarian	Dan Hogan	92	3.07%	+0.66
	Write-ins	1	0.03%	

Daviess County, along with the rest of the state of Missouri, is represented in the U.S. Senate by Josh Hawley (R-Columbia) and Roy Blunt (R-Strafford).

U.S. Senate – Class I – Daviess County (2018)
Party	Candidate	Votes	%	±%
Republican	Josh Hawley	2,063	68.65%	25.04
Democratic	Claire McCaskill	815	27.12%	−19.96
Independent	Craig O'Dear	58	1.86%	
Libertarian	Japheth Campbell	45	1.50%	−7.81
Green	Jo Crain	23	0.77%	+0.77
	Write-Ins	3	0.10%	

Blunt was elected to a second term in 2016 over then-Missouri Secretary of State Jason Kander.

U.S. Senate - Class III - Daviess County (2016)
Party	Candidate	Votes	%	±%
Republican	Roy Blunt	2,213	59.31%	+15.70
Democratic	Jason Kander	1,266	33.93%	−13.15
Libertarian	Jonathan Dine	149	3.99%	−5.32
Constitution	Fred Ryman	55	1.47%	+1.47
Green	Johnathan McFarland	48	1.29%	+1.29

==== Political culture ====
United States presidential election results for Daviess County, Missouri
Year	Republican		Democratic		Third party(ies)	
Year	No.	%	No.	%	No.	%
1888	2,049	44.21%	2,320	50.05%	266	5.74%
1892	2,019	42.57%	2,257	47.59%	467	9.85%
1896	2,330	42.33%	3,125	56.77%	50	0.91%
1900	2,373	45.29%	2,670	50.95%	197	3.76%
1904	2,568	50.31%	2,344	45.92%	192	3.76%
1908	2,388	50.14%	2,294	48.16%	81	1.70%
1912	1,099	23.72%	2,284	49.29%	1,251	27.00%
1916	2,342	49.06%	2,375	49.75%	57	1.19%
1920	4,458	54.92%	3,560	43.85%	100	1.23%
1924	3,869	51.42%	3,520	46.78%	135	1.79%
1928	4,254	60.28%	2,789	39.52%	14	0.20%
1932	2,351	39.81%	3,523	59.65%	32	0.54%
1936	3,924	49.66%	3,953	50.03%	25	0.32%
1940	4,289	56.25%	3,325	43.61%	11	0.14%
1944	3,597	58.31%	2,567	41.61%	5	0.08%
1948	2,823	49.59%	2,868	50.38%	2	0.04%
1952	3,845	61.21%	2,424	38.59%	13	0.21%
1956	3,326	56.02%	2,611	43.98%	0	0.00%
1960	3,191	58.97%	2,220	41.03%	0	0.00%
1964	1,874	40.62%	2,739	59.38%	0	0.00%
1968	2,288	53.23%	1,676	38.99%	334	7.77%
1972	2,840	66.51%	1,430	33.49%	0	0.00%
1976	1,919	45.79%	2,250	53.69%	22	0.52%
1980	2,125	53.34%	1,770	44.43%	89	2.23%
1984	2,414	61.27%	1,526	38.73%	0	0.00%
1988	1,765	50.17%	1,743	49.55%	10	0.28%
1992	1,107	29.66%	1,477	39.58%	1,148	30.76%
1996	1,321	39.40%	1,534	45.75%	498	14.85%
2000	2,011	57.56%	1,367	39.12%	116	3.32%
2004	2,351	61.97%	1,402	36.95%	41	1.08%
2008	2,263	59.77%	1,400	36.98%	123	3.25%
2012	2,290	65.04%	1,125	31.95%	106	3.01%
2016	2,767	74.02%	730	19.53%	241	6.45%
2020	3,102	79.31%	746	19.07%	63	1.61%
2024	3,185	81.15%	701	17.86%	39	0.99%

At the presidential level, Daviess County has become solidly Republican in recent years. Daviess County strongly favored Donald Trump in both 2016 and 2020. Bill Clinton was the last Democratic presidential nominee to carry Daviess County in 1996 with a plurality of the vote, and a Democrat hasn't won majority support from the county's voters in a presidential election since Jimmy Carter in 1976.

Like most rural areas throughout northwest Missouri, voters in Daviess County generally adhere to socially and culturally conservative principles which tend to influence their Republican leanings, at least on the state and national levels. In 2004, Missourians voted on a constitutional amendment to define marriage as the union between a man and a woman—it overwhelmingly passed in Daviess County with 79.58% of the vote. The initiative passed with 71% support from voters statewide. In 2006, Missourians voted on a constitutional amendment to fund and legalize embryonic stem cell research in the state—it failed in Daviess County with 50.96% voting against the measure. The initiative narrowly passed the state with 51% of support from voters as Missouri became one of the first states in the nation to approve embryonic stem cell research. Despite Daviess County's longstanding tradition of supporting socially conservative platforms, voters in the county have a penchant for advancing populist causes like increasing the minimum wage. In 2006, Missourians voted on a proposition (Proposition B) to increase the minimum wage in the state to $6.50 an hour—it passed Daviess County with 68.25% of the vote. The proposition strongly passed every single county in Missouri with 78.99% voting in favor. (During the same election, voters in five other states also strongly approved increases in the minimum wage.) In 2018, Missourians voted on a proposition (Proposition A) concerning right to work, the outcome of which ultimately reversed the right to work legislation passed in the state the previous year. 62.93% of Daviess County voters cast their ballots to overturn the law.

=== Missouri presidential preference primaries ===
==== 2020 ====
The 2020 presidential primaries for both the Democratic and Republican parties were held in Missouri on March 10. On the Democratic side, former Vice President Joe Biden (D-Delaware) both won statewide and carried Daviess County by a wide margin. Biden went on to defeat President Donald Trump in the general election.

Missouri Democratic Presidential Primary – Daviess County (2020)
Party	Candidate	Votes	%	±%
Democratic	Joe Biden	302	70.73	
Democratic	Bernie Sanders	94	22.01	
Democratic	Tulsi Gabbard	5	1.17	
Democratic	Others/Uncommitted	26	6.09	

Incumbent President Donald Trump (R-Florida) faced a primary challenge from former Massachusetts Governor Bill Weld, but won both Daviess County and statewide by overwhelming margins.

Missouri Republican Presidential Primary – Daviess County (2020)
Party	Candidate	Votes	%	±%
Republican	Donald Trump	486	96.24	
Republican	Bill Weld	6	1.19	
Republican	Others/Uncommitted	13	2.57	

==== 2016 ====
The 2016 presidential primaries for both the Republican and Democratic parties were held in Missouri on March 15. Businessman Donald Trump (R-New York) narrowly won the state overall, but carried a majority of the vote in Daviess County. He went on to win the presidency.

Missouri Republican Presidential Primary – Daviess County (2016)
Party	Candidate	Votes	%	±%
Republican	Donald Trump	634	50.32	
Republican	Ted Cruz	410	32.54	
Republican	John Kasich	105	8.33	
Republican	Marco Rubio	74	5.87	
Republican	Others/Uncommitted	37	2.94	

On the Democratic side, former Secretary of State Hillary Clinton (D-New York) both won statewide and carried Daviess County by a small margin.

Missouri Democratic Presidential Primary – Daviess County (2016)
Party	Candidate	Votes	%	±%
Democratic	Hillary Clinton	239	51.07	
Democratic	Bernie Sanders	221	47.22	
Democratic	Others/Uncommitted	8	1.71	

==== 2012 ====
The 2012 Missouri Republican Presidential Primary's results were nonbinding on the state's national convention delegates. Voters in Daviess County supported former U.S. Senator Rick Santorum (R-Pennsylvania), who finished first in the state at large, but eventually lost the nomination to former Governor Mitt Romney (R-Massachusetts). Delegates to the congressional district and state conventions were chosen at a county caucus, which selected a delegation favoring Santorum. Incumbent President Barack Obama easily won the Missouri Democratic Primary and renomination. He defeated Romney in the general election.

==== 2008 ====
In 2008, the Missouri Republican Presidential Primary was closely contested, with Senator John McCain (R-Arizona) prevailing and eventually winning the nomination.

Missouri Republican Presidential Primary – Daviess County (2008)
Party	Candidate	Votes	%	±%
Republican	John McCain	236	29.99	
Republican	Mitt Romney	220	27.95	
Republican	Mike Huckabee	216	27.45	
Republican	Ron Paul	95	12.07	
Republican	Others/Uncommitted	20	2.54	

Then-Senator Hillary Clinton (D-New York) received more votes than any candidate from either party in Daviess County during the 2008 presidential primary. Despite initial reports that Clinton had won Missouri, Barack Obama (D-Illinois), also a Senator at the time, narrowly defeated her statewide and later became that year's Democratic nominee, going on to win the presidency.

Missouri Democratic Presidential Primary – Daviess County (2008)
Party	Candidate	Votes	%	±%
Democratic	Hillary Clinton	534	62.75	
Democratic	Barack Obama	283	33.25	
Democratic	Others/Uncommitted	34	4.00	

== See also ==
- National Register of Historic Places listings in Daviess County, Missouri
