= Jameson, Missouri =

- Village
- Location of Jameson, Missouri
- Coordinates: 40°00′21″N 93°59′16″W
- Country: United States
- State: Missouri
- County: Daviess

Area
  - Total: 0.22 sq mi (0.58 km^{2})
  - Land: 0.22 sq mi (0.58 km^{2})
  - Water: 0 sq mi (0.00 km^{2})
- Elevation: 833 ft (254 m)

Population (2020)
  - Total: 73
  - Density: 325.7/sq mi (125.77/km^{2})
- Time zone: UTC-6 (Central (CST))
  - Summer (DST): UTC-5 (CDT)
- ZIP code: 64647
- Area code: 660
- FIPS code: 29-36314
- GNIS feature ID: 2397009
- Website: www.jamesonmo.org

Jameson is a village in Daviess County, Missouri, United States. The population was 73 at the 2020 census.

== History ==
Jameson was originally named Feurt Summit, and under the latter name was laid out in 1871. A post office called Jameson has been in operation since 1871.

== Geography ==
According to the United States Census Bureau, the village has a total area of 0.22 square miles (0.57 km^{2}), all land.

== Demographics ==
Historical population
Census	Pop.	Note	%±
1880	405		—
1890	429		5.9%
1900	335		−21.9%
1910	358		6.9%
1920	329		−8.1%
1930	260		−21.0%
1940	223		−14.2%
1950	185		−17.0%
1960	177		−4.3%
1970	172		−2.8%
1980	172		0.0%
1990	149		−13.4%
2000	120		−19.5%
2010	133		10.8%
2020	73		−45.1%
U.S. Decennial Census

=== 2010 census ===
As of the census of 2010, there were 133 people, 50 households, and 32 families living in the village. The population density was 604.5 inhabitants per square mile (233.4/km^{2}). There were 63 housing units at an average density of 286.4 per square mile (110.6/km^{2}). The racial makeup of the village was 88.0% White, 2.3% Native American, 0.8% from other races, and 9.0% from two or more races. Hispanic or Latino of any race were 3.0% of the population.

There were 50 households, of which 36.0% had children under the age of 18 living with them, 38.0% were married couples living together, 12.0% had a female householder with no husband present, 14.0% had a male householder with no wife present, and 36.0% were non-families. 34.0% of all households were made up of individuals, and 12% had someone living alone who was 65 years of age or older. The average household size was 2.66 and the average family size was 3.19.

The median age in the village was 35.5 years. 34.6% of residents were under the age of 18; 3.1% were between the ages of 18 and 24; 24.9% were from 25 to 44; 26.4% were from 45 to 64; and 11.3% were 65 years of age or older. The gender makeup of the village was 46.6% male and 53.4% female.

=== 2000 census ===
As of the census of 2000, there were 125 people, 56 households, and 37 families living in the town. The population density was 541.7 inhabitants per square mile (209.2/km^{2}). There were 70 housing units at an average density of 316.0 per square mile (122.0/km^{2}). The racial makeup of the town was 99.17% White, and 0.83% from two or more races.

There were 56 households, out of which 28.6% had children under the age of 18 living with them, 44.6% were married couples living together, 14.3% had a female householder with no husband present, and 33.9% were non-families. 32.1% of all households were made up of individuals, and 12.5% had someone living alone who was 65 years of age or older. The average household size was 2.14 and the average family size was 2.54.

In the town the population was spread out, with 20.0% under the age of 18, 20.0% from 18 to 24, 21.7% from 25 to 44, 22.5% from 45 to 64, and 15.8% who were 65 years of age or older. The median age was 38 years. For every 100 females, there were 71.4 males. For every 100 females age 18 and over, there were 71.4 males.

The median income for a household in the town was $21,750, and the median income for a family was $26,250. Males had a median income of $22,189 versus $14,688 for females. The per capita income for the town was $10,351. There were 14.7% of families and 17.9% of the population living below the poverty line, including 8.0% of under eighteens and 50.0% of those over 64.

== Education ==
It is in the North Daviess R-III School District.
