= Gallatin, Missouri =

- City
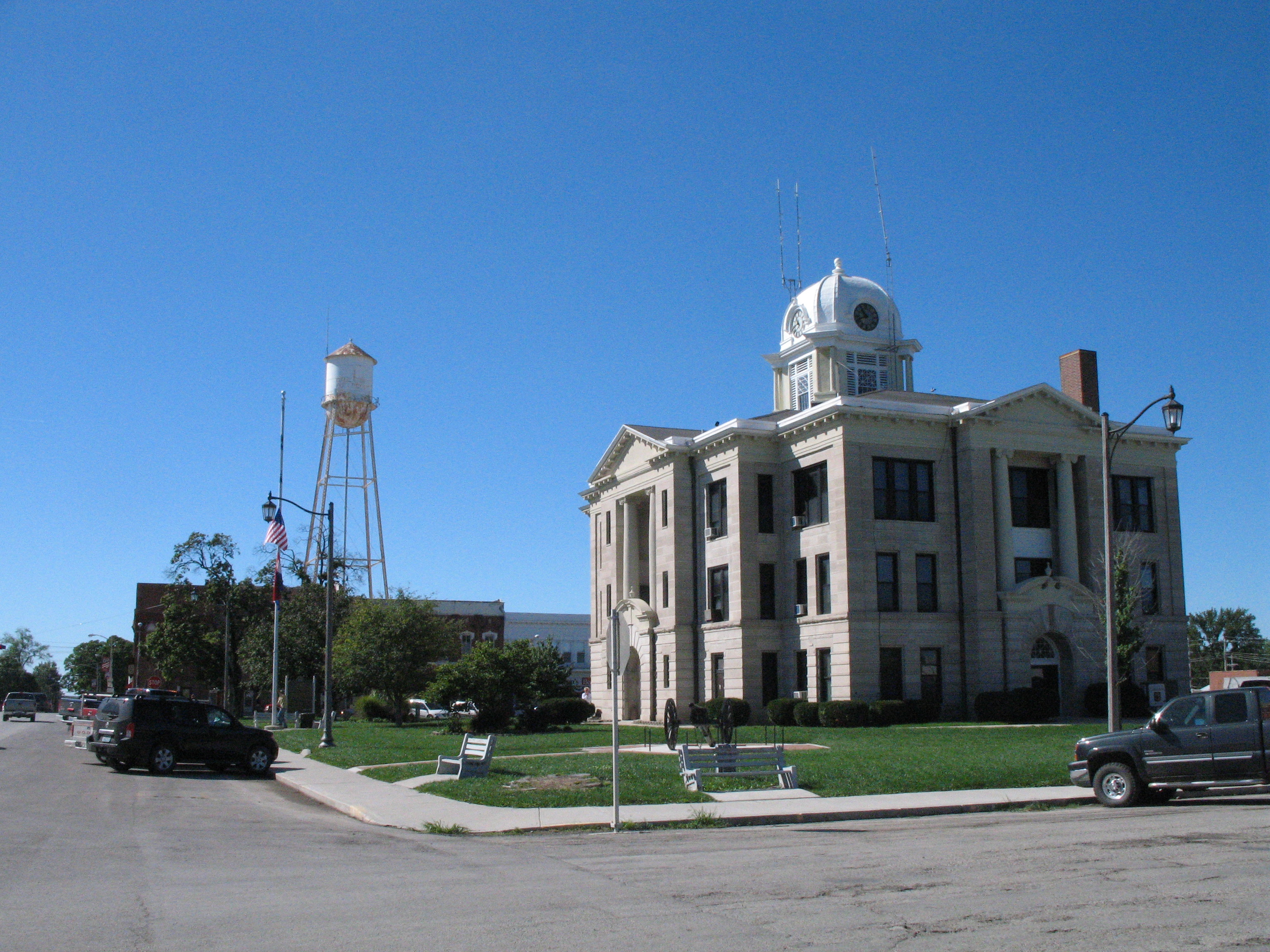
- Daviess County Courthouse

- Location of Gallatin, Missouri
- Coordinates: 39°54′38″N 93°57′51″W
- Country: United States
- State: Missouri
- County: Daviess
- Incorporated: 1856

Government
  - Mayor: Barb Ballew

Area
  - Total: 2.76 sq mi (7.16 km^{2})
  - Land: 2.75 sq mi (7.12 km^{2})
  - Water: 0.015 sq mi (0.04 km^{2})
- Elevation: 915 ft (279 m)

Population (2020)
  - Total: 1,821
  - Density: 662.6/sq mi (255.83/km^{2})
- Time zone: UTC-6 (Central (CST))
  - Summer (DST): UTC-5 (CDT)
- ZIP code: 64640
- Area code: 660
- FIPS code: 29-26308
- GNIS feature ID: 2394844
- Website: www.cityofgallatinmo.org

Gallatin is a city in Daviess County, Missouri, United States. The population was 1,821 at the 2020 census. It is the county seat of Daviess County.

== History ==
The territory now known as the county of Daviess, was initially inhabited by the Sauk, Meskwaki, and Pottawatomi peoples. "The Treaty of 1837 removed the Sac and Fox Nation of Missouri into Kansas." "Gallatin was founded in 1837 and named for Albert Gallatin, America's longest-serving Secretary of the Treasury (1801–1814). Gallatin was incorporated in 1856. A variant spelling was Galatin.

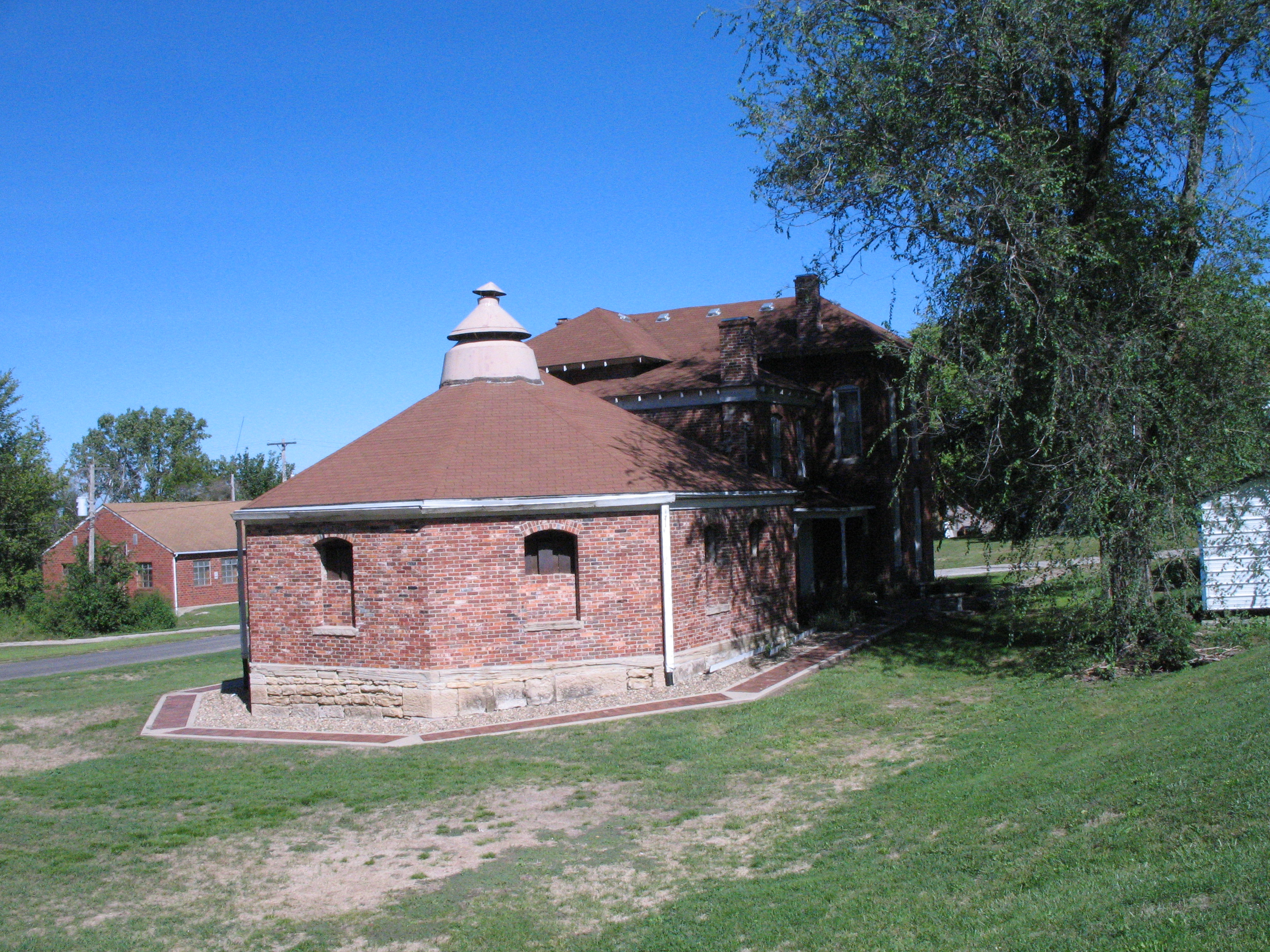
Rotary jail in Gallatin

The Gallatin Election Day Battle took place on 6 August 1838. About 200 people attempted to forcibly prevent Latter-day Saints (also known as Mormons) from voting in the newly created county's first election. In October 1838, David W. Patten led Mormon troops in the Daviess County expedition in which the Mormons burned and looted much of Gallatin, Millport and Grindstone Fork, consecrating the stolen goods to the bishop's storehouse. The skirmishes were part of the 1838 Mormon War. Gallatin is important in the Latter-day Saint religion; nearby is a place known to its members as Adam-ondi-Ahman. They believe it to be the site where Adam and Eve lived after they had been expelled from the Garden of Eden.

On December 7, 1869 Jesse James (and most likely Frank) robbed the Daviess County Savings Association. The robbery netted little money. Jesse is believed to have shot and killed the cashier, Captain John Sheets.

In 1892, Grand River College moved from Edinburg, Missouri to Gallatin, where it operated for a period under the auspices of William Jewell College before it closed permanently in 1910 after a fire.

The Daviess County Rotary Jail and Sheriff's Residence, the A. Taylor Ray House and the Daviess County Courthouse are listed on the National Register of Historic Places.

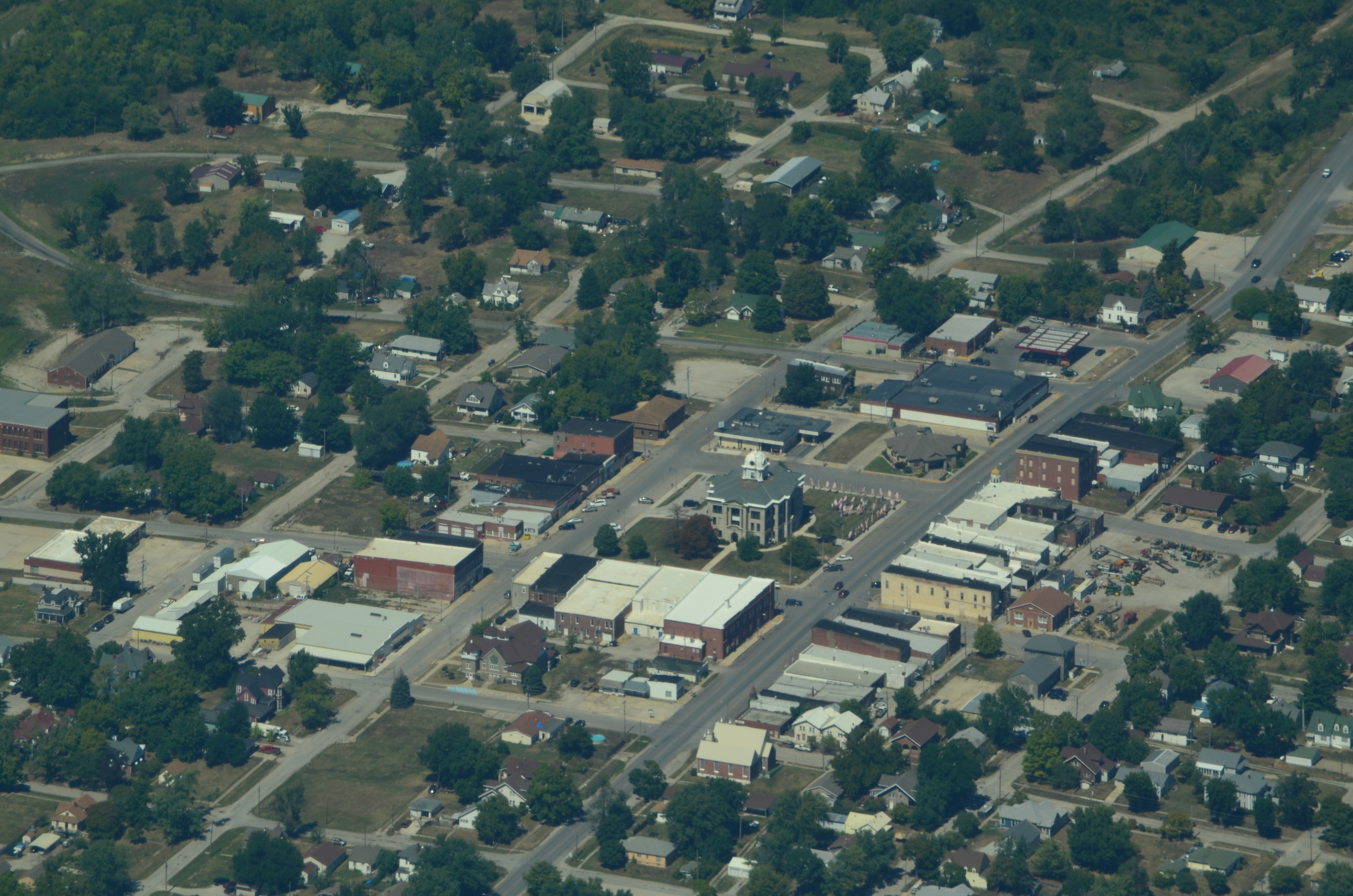
Aerial view of Gallatin, Missouri

== Geography ==
Gallatin is located at the intersection of Missouri routes 6 and 13. The Grand River flows past about one mile east of the city.

According to the United States Census Bureau, the city has a total area of 2.77 square miles (7.17 km^{2}), of which 2.75 square miles (7.12 km^{2}) is land and 0.02 square miles (0.05 km^{2}) is water.

Climate data for Gallatin, Missouri
Month	Jan	Feb	Mar	Apr	May	Jun	Jul	Aug	Sep	Oct	Nov	Dec	Year
Record high °F (°C)	69 (21)	76 (24)	86 (30)	93 (34)	92 (33)	105 (41)	107 (42)	109 (43)	102 (39)	92 (33)	82 (28)	70 (21)	109 (43)
Mean daily maximum °F (°C)	34.1 (1.2)	39.5 (4.2)	51.6 (10.9)	62.9 (17.2)	72.6 (22.6)	82.0 (27.8)	85.8 (29.9)	84.4 (29.1)	77.1 (25.1)	64.8 (18.2)	50.4 (10.2)	38.1 (3.4)	61.2 (16.2)
Mean daily minimum °F (°C)	15.7 (−9.1)	19.5 (−6.9)	29.9 (−1.2)	40.2 (4.6)	51.5 (10.8)	61.6 (16.4)	65.7 (18.7)	63.2 (17.3)	54.3 (12.4)	42.3 (5.7)	30.5 (−0.8)	20.4 (−6.4)	41.2 (5.1)
Record low °F (°C)	−17 (−27)	−19 (−28)	−10 (−23)	12 (−11)	30 (−1)	42 (6)	54 (12)	43 (6)	33 (1)	21 (−6)	1 (−17)	−23 (−31)	−23 (−31)
Average precipitation inches (mm)	1.43 (36)	1.78 (45)	2.52 (64)	3.59 (91)	5.60 (142)	5.63 (143)	4.39 (112)	4.22 (107)	4.53 (115)	3.31 (84)	2.03 (52)	1.80 (46)	40.83 (1,037)
Average snowfall inches (cm)	6.2 (16)	5.6 (14)	1.6 (4.1)	0.3 (0.76)	0 (0)	0 (0)	0 (0)	0 (0)	0 (0)	0 (0)	1.0 (2.5)	4.9 (12)	19.6 (50)
Source: NOAA

== Demographics ==
Historical population
Census	Pop.	Note	%±
1860	448		—
1870	683		52.5%
1880	1,141		67.1%
1890	1,489		30.5%
1900	1,780		19.5%
1910	1,825		2.5%
1920	1,747		−4.3%
1930	1,504		−13.9%
1940	1,642		9.2%
1950	1,634		−0.5%
1960	1,658		1.5%
1970	1,833		10.6%
1980	2,063		12.5%
1990	1,864		−9.6%
2000	1,789		−4.0%
2010	1,786		−0.2%
2020	1,821		2.0%
U.S. Decennial Census

=== 2020 census ===
As of the 2020 census, Gallatin had a population of 1,821. The median age was 38.2 years. 27.6% of residents were under the age of 18 and 20.4% of residents were 65 years of age or older. For every 100 females there were 89.9 males, and for every 100 females age 18 and over there were 86.0 males age 18 and over.

0.0% of residents lived in urban areas, while 100.0% lived in rural areas.

There were 753 households in Gallatin, of which 31.1% had children under the age of 18 living in them. Of all households, 40.9% were married-couple households, 19.9% were households with a male householder and no spouse or partner present, and 32.3% were households with a female householder and no spouse or partner present. About 36.2% of all households were made up of individuals and 18.3% had someone living alone who was 65 years of age or older.

There were 897 housing units, of which 16.1% were vacant. The homeowner vacancy rate was 3.3% and the rental vacancy rate was 12.4%.

Racial composition as of the 2020 census
Race	Number	Percent
White	1,701	93.4%
Black or African American	9	0.5%
American Indian and Alaska Native	3	0.2%
Asian	5	0.3%
Native Hawaiian and Other Pacific Islander	2	0.1%
Some other race	6	0.3%
Two or more races	95	5.2%
Hispanic or Latino (of any race)	30	1.6%

=== 2010 census ===
As of the census of 2010, there were 1,786 people, 712 households, and 471 families living in the city. The population density was 649.5 inhabitants per square mile (250.8/km^{2}). There were 880 housing units at an average density of 320.0 per square mile (123.6/km^{2}). The racial makeup of the city was 98.0% White, 0.3% African American, 0.1% Native American, 0.1% Asian, and 1.5% from two or more races. Hispanic or Latino of any race were 0.7% of the population.

There were 712 households, of which 33.4% had children under the age of 18 living with them, 49.3% were married couples living together, 12.2% had a female householder with no husband present, 4.6% had a male householder with no wife present, and 33.8% were non-families. 30.3% of all households were made up of individuals, and 14% had someone living alone who was 65 years of age or older. The average household size was 2.47 and the average family size was 3.04.

The median age in the city was 38.6 years. 26.6% of residents were under the age of 18; 8.1% were between the ages of 18 and 24; 22.9% were from 25 to 44; 24.1% were from 45 to 64; and 18.3% were 65 years of age or older. The gender makeup of the city was 46.7% male and 53.3% female.

=== 2000 census ===
As of the census of 2000, there were 1,789 people, 771 households, and 477 families living in the city. The population density was 640.1 inhabitants per square mile (247.1/km^{2}). There were 905 housing units at an average density of 323.8 per square mile (125.0/km^{2}). The racial makeup of the city was 99.27% White, 0.06% African American, 0.22% Native American, 0.06% from other races, and 0.39% from two or more races. Hispanic or Latino of any race were 0.39% of the population.

There were 771 households, out of which 31.0% had children under the age of 18 living with them, 49.5% were married couples living together, 9.9% had a female householder with no husband present, and 38.1% were non-families. 35.5% of all households were made up of individuals, and 20.2% had someone living alone who was 65 years of age or older. The average household size was 2.25 and the average family size was 2.92.

In the city, the population was spread out, with 25.8% under the age of 18, 7.2% from 18 to 24, 24.0% from 25 to 44, 20.7% from 45 to 64, and 22.3% who were 65 years of age or older. The median age was 40 years. For every 100 females, there were 83.3 males. For every 100 females age 18 and over, there were 76.5 males.

The median income for a household in the city was $32,321, and the median income for a family was $41,857. Males had a median income of $27,460 versus $27,448 for females. The per capita income for the city was $16,537. About 13.2% of families and 22.2% of the population were below the poverty line, including 30.2% of those under age 18 and 12.4% of those age 65 or over.

== Education ==
PreK-12 public education is provided by the Gallatin R-V School District. PreK-4 is located at Covel D. Searcy Elementary School, 5–8 at Gallatin Middle School, and 9–12 at Gallatin High School.

Gallatin has the main branch of the Daviess County Library.

== Media ==
Gallatin was served by a weekly newspaper, the Gallatin North Missourian, which circulated from 1865 to 2021.

== Notable people ==
- Joshua Willis Alexander - U.S. Secretary of Commerce, 1919–1921
- Conrad Burns - U.S. Senator from Montana, 1989–2007
- Alexander Monroe Dockery - Governor of Missouri, 1901–1905
- Brice Garnett - professional golfer
- Mervin Kelly - physicist and engineer
- William Thornton Kemper Sr. - patriarch of the Missouri Kemper financial family
- Walter Page - jazz bassist
- Johnny Ringo - outlaw who briefly lived in the town
