= National Register of Historic Places listings in Grundy County, Missouri =

Location of Grundy County in Missouri

This is a list of the National Register of Historic Places listings in Grundy County, Missouri.

This is intended to be a complete list of the properties and districts on the National Register of Historic Places in Grundy County, Missouri, United States. Latitude and longitude coordinates are provided for many National Register properties and districts; these locations may be seen together in a map.

There are 7 properties and districts listed on the National Register in the county.

This National Park Service list is complete through NPS recent listings posted March 14, 2025.

== Current listings ==
	Name on the Register	Image	Date listed	Location	City or town	Description
1	Crowder State Park Vehicle Bridge		March 4, 1985 (#85000505)	Route 128; 40°05′31″N 93°39′51″W	Trenton	A bridge in Crowder State Park
2	Jewett Norris Library	Jewett Norris Library	September 7, 1984 (#84002549)	1331 Main St. 40°04′43″N 93°36′22″W	Trenton	
3	Plaza Hotel	Plaza Hotel	July 18, 2001 (#01000010)	715 Main St. 40°04′27″N 93°37′08″W	Trenton	
4	St. Philip's Episcopal Church	St. Philip's Episcopal Church	July 17, 1979 (#79001361)	141 E. 9th St. 40°04′25″N 93°37′00″W	Trenton	
5	Trenton High School	Trenton High School	April 21, 2010 (#10000203)	1312 E. 9th St. 40°04′27″N 93°36′21″W	Trenton	
6	WPA Stock Barn and Pavilion	WPA Stock Barn and Pavilion	April 25, 1994 (#94000314)	Oklahoma St. at Eastside Park; 40°04′41″N 93°35′59″W	Trenton	
7	George Wolz House	George Wolz House	July 19, 2018 (#100002690)	605 W Crowder Rd. 40°04′43″N 93°37′22″W	Trenton	

== See also ==
- List of National Historic Landmarks in Missouri
- National Register of Historic Places listings in Missouri
