= Trenton =

Trenton may refer to:

== Places ==
=== Canada ===
- Trenton, Nova Scotia, a town
- Trenton, Ontario, an unincorporated community

=== United States ===
- Trenton, Alabama, an unincorporated community
- Trenton, Florida, a city
- Trenton, Georgia, a city
- Trenton, Illinois, a city
- Trenton, Indiana, an unincorporated community
- Trenton, Iowa, a census-designated place
- Trenton, Kansas, an unincorporated community
- Trenton, Kentucky, a city
- Trenton, Maine, a town
- Trenton, Michigan, a small city
- Trenton, Missouri, a city
- Trenton, Nebraska, a village
- Trenton, New Jersey, the capital of New Jersey and the most populous and well-known municipality bearing the name
- Trenton, New York, a town
- Trenton, North Carolina, a town
- Trenton, North Dakota, an unincorporated community
- Trenton, Ohio, a city
- Trenton, South Carolina, a town
- Trenton, Tennessee, a city
- Trenton, Texas, a city
- Trenton, Utah, a town
- Trenton, Wisconsin (disambiguation)
- Trenton Township (disambiguation)

== People ==
- Trenton (given name)
- Daniel Trenton (born 1977), Australian taekwondo athlete
- Jim Trenton (born 1953), American radio broadcaster
- Pell Trenton, stage name of William T. Baker (1883–1924), American actor

== Military ==
- Battle of Trenton, a 1776 American Revolutionary War battle fought in New Jersey
- Second Battle of Trenton, a 1777 battle
- USS Trenton, the name of four United States Navy ships
- CFB Trenton, a Canadian Forces Base near Trenton, Ontario
- Operation Trenton (2016–2020), the UK contribution to the United Nations Mission in South Sudan

== Schools ==
- Trenton High School (disambiguation)
- Trenton Academy, a former private school in Trenton, New Jersey, from 1781 to 1884
- Trenton Catholic Academy, Trenton, New Jersey, a former Catholic school

== Sports ==
=== Teams ===
- Trenton F.C., an amateur soccer team based in Trenton, New Jersey in the 1920s
- Trenton Giants, a former minor league baseball team, based in Trenton, New Jersey
- Trenton Lightning, a former indoor professional football team based in Trenton, New Jersey
- Trenton Moose, an American basketball team based in Trenton, New Jersey, that was a member of the National Basketball League and the American Basketball League
- Trenton Steel, a professional indoor football team based in Trenton, New Jersey, in 2011 only
- Trenton Thunder, a collegiate summer baseball team in the MLB Draft League based in Trenton, New Jersey
- Trenton Tigers, a former American basketball team based in Trenton, New Jersey, a member of the American Basketball League from 1941 to 1950
- Trenton Titans, a former professional minor league ice hockey team based in Trenton, New Jersey
- Trenton Trentonians, a minor league baseball team that played in Trenton, New Jersey, from 1883 to 1885
- Trenton Reds, a minor league baseball team in 1922, based in Trenton, Tennessee
- Trenton Golden Hawks, a junior ice hockey team once based in Trenton, Ontario
- Trenton Sting, a former Junior A ice hockey team from Trenton, Ontario

=== Other sports ===
- Trenton Handicap, a former American Thoroughbred horse race
- Trenton Speedway, a former racing facility located near Trenton, New Jersey

== Other uses ==
- Roman Catholic Diocese of Trenton, New Jersey
- Trenton Airport (disambiguation)
- Trenton station (disambiguation)
- Trenton (Cumberland, Virginia), a historic plantation home located near Cumberland, Virginia
- Trenton (pilot boat), formerly the fishing schooner Kernwood
- Trenton Dam, on the Republican River in Nebraska
- The Trenton family, characters in the novel Cujo, by Stephen King, and its film adaptation

== See also ==
- Trenton Historic District (disambiguation)
- Trenton Line, a train line that goes from Trenton, New Jersey to Philadelphia
- Trenton Six, six African-American defendants tried for murder of an elderly white shopkeeper in 1948
