= Tindall, Missouri =

- City
- Location of Tindall, Missouri
- Coordinates: 40°09′39″N 93°36′35″W
- Country: United States
- State: Missouri
- County: Grundy

Government
  - Mayor: Gregory Irwin
  - Treasurer: Drew Morris
  - City Manager: Kiren MacLeod

Area
  - Total: 0.13 sq mi (0.34 km^{2})
  - Land: 0.13 sq mi (0.34 km^{2})
  - Water: 0 sq mi (0.00 km^{2})
- Elevation: 791 ft (241 m)

Population (2020)
  - Total: 46
  - Density: 348.3/sq mi (134.47/km^{2})
- Time zone: UTC-6 (Central (CST))
  - Summer (DST): UTC-5 (CDT)
- FIPS code: 29-73348
- GNIS feature ID: 2397696

Tindall is a city in Grundy County, Missouri, United States. The population was 46 as of the 2020 census.

== History ==
Tindall was laid out in 1872 when the railroad was extended to that point. A post office was established at Tindall in 1869, and remained in operation until 1967. The city has the name of Jacob A. Tindall, an officer in the Civil War.

== Geography ==
Tindall is located along U.S. Route 65 between Trenton five miles to the south and Spickard five miles to the north. The Weldon River flows past approximately 1.5 miles to the west.

According to the United States Census Bureau, the city has a total area of 0.13 square miles (0.34 km^{2}), all land.

== Demographics ==
Historical population
Census	Pop.	Note	%±
1930	134		—
1940	125		−6.7%
1950	102		−18.4%
1960	94		−7.8%
1970	92		−2.1%
1980	104		13.0%
1990	46		−55.8%
2000	65		41.3%
2010	77		18.5%
2020	46		−40.3%
U.S. Decennial Census

=== 2010 census ===
As of the census of 2010, there were 77 people, 32 households, and 20 families living in the city. The population density was 592.3 inhabitants per square mile (228.7/km^{2}). There were 34 housing units at an average density of 261.5 per square mile (101.0/km^{2}). The racial makeup of the city was 100.0% White.

There were 32 households, of which 25.0% had children under the age of 18 living with them, 50.0% were married couples living together, 6.3% had a female householder with no husband present, 6.3% had a male householder with no wife present, and 37.5% were non-families. 34.4% of all households were made up of individuals, and 25% had someone living alone who was 65 years of age or older. The average household size was 2.41 and the average family size was 3.05.

The median age in the city was 43.5 years. 31.2% of residents were under the age of 18; 2.6% were between the ages of 18 and 24; 18.2% were from 25 to 44; 33.8% were from 45 to 64; and 14.3% were 65 years of age or older. The gender makeup of the city was 46.8% male and 53.2% female.

=== 2000 census ===
As of the census of 2000, there were 65 people, 29 households, and 18 families living in the town. The population density was 496.9 inhabitants per square mile (191.9/km^{2}). There were 36 housing units at an average density of 275.2 per square mile (106.3/km^{2}). The racial makeup of the town was 100.00% White.

There were 29 households, out of which 31.0% had children under the age of 18 living with them, 51.7% were married couples living together, 13.8% had a female householder with no husband present, and 34.5% were non-families. 27.6% of all households were made up of individuals, and 6.9% had someone living alone who was 65 years of age or older. The average household size was 2.24 and the average family size was 2.68.

In the town the population was spread out, with 26.2% under the age of 18, 6.2% from 18 to 24, 32.3% from 25 to 44, 20.0% from 45 to 64, and 15.4% who were 65 years of age or older. The median age was 32 years. For every 100 females, there were 116.7 males. For every 100 females age 18 and over, there were 92.0 males.

The median income for a household in the town was $16,563, and the median income for a family was $35,625. Males had a median income of $19,167 versus $25,833 for females. The per capita income for the town was $10,721. There were 13.3% of families and 14.8% of the population living below the poverty line, including 14.3% of under eighteens and none of those over 64.
