= Hickory Creek, Grundy County, Missouri =

Unincorporated community in Missouri, U.S.

Coordinates: 39°59′53″N 93°40′10″W

Hickory Creek (also called Hickory) is an unincorporated community in southwest Grundy County, in the U.S. state of Missouri. The community is on the banks of Hickory Creek along the west margin of the Thompson River bottomland and six miles south-southwest of Trenton.

== History ==
A post office called Hickory was established in 1878, and remained in operation until 1942. The community takes its name from nearby Hickory Creek.
