= Kelly Ray Masters =

American novelist (1897–1987)

- Born: June 16, 1897; Mill Grove, Missouri, U.S.
- Died: July 4, 1987 (aged 90); Roswell, New Mexico, U.S.
- Occupation: Writer
- Spouse: Gladys Green (m. 1931)
- Children: 1
- Writing career
- Pen name: Zachary Ball
- Genre: Adventure fiction

Kelly Ray Masters Sr. (June 16, 1897 – July 4, 1987), was an American writer using the pen name Zachary Ball. He is known best for Joe Panther, Bristle Face, and other adventure novels for boys.

== Life and career ==
Masters was born in Mill Grove, Missouri in the Blackjack Hills, to Abelino and Iva (Herrick) Masters in 1897. Between the ages of six and thirteen, he lived in southeast Kansas near Altoona and spent much of his boyhood boating, rafting, and camping along the Verdigris River. "I was still a boy when I first met Old Man River, he later said, "and I got to know him well." Masters dropped out of school at 13 in order to support his family - first by working for a riprap gang building retaining walls along the Missouri River and then through a series of factory jobs in Kansas City, Kansas, and St. Joseph, Missouri. In 1914, while working as a bellhop at the St. Joseph hotel, he joined a small tent repertory show and spent the next twenty-five years touring almost every state in the union with various troupes and as part of a musical act with his younger brother.

Masters married Gladys Green in 1931 and had a son, Kelly Ray Jr, in 1938. While living in Austin, Texas, he began to sell stories to magazines of widely varying quality in an attempt to supplement his income. Masters took the pen name Zachary Ball by combining the names of two of his favorite movie stars: Zachary Scott and Lucille Ball. Eventually he would co-write several short stories for Collier's and the Saturday Evening Post with author Frankie-Lee Weed. The pair submitted stories under Weed's pen name (Saliee O'Brien) when the lead character was a woman and under Ball's name when a man. Ball published two books for adults, Pull Down to New Orleans (1945) and Piney (1950), before turning to children's fiction for the school library market. Pull Down to New Orleans was featured in Liberty Magazine on January 18, 1947.

== Books for boys ==
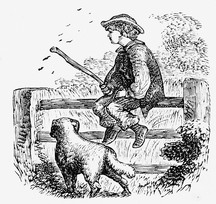
The bond between a boy and his dog - a theme that Masters often explored in his books and short stories.

From his experiences growing up in Kansas and Missouri along the river, Masters decided to write books for boys using the river or ocean as backgrounds. Masters' first seven books for boys would share this common theme. Two of his arguably most popular books in this genre are Joe Panther and Bristle Face.

Joe Panther (1950), a novel about a young Seminole in south Florida, was Master's first juvenile work. The plot centers around Joe Panther as he comes of age outside the Florida Everglades by trying to enter the establishment (white man's world). He gets work as crew member on a fishing boat, hunts for alligators, and has cathartic encounters with bad guys trying to bring illegal aliens into Florida on fishing boats. Joe Panther was adapted as a motion picture in 1976, directed by Paul Krasny and starring Ray Tracey in the title role. Masters wrote a number of Joe Panther sequels, including Swamp Chief (1952), Skin Diver (1956), and Salvage Diver (1961).

Bristle Face (1962), one of Ball's many tales prominently featuring boys and their dogs, received the Dorothy Canfield Fisher and William Allen White children's book awards for 1964 and 1965, respectively. The story is based on runaway teen Jase Landers who is befriended first by stray dog Bristle Face and then by lazy general store owner Lute Swank. The book follows their adventures together as Jase, Lute, and the grand-fatherly neighbor Emory Packer teach Bristle Face to hunt foxes. Similar in many ways to Wilson Rawls 1961 novel Where The Red Fern Grows, Masters would follow up the huge success of Bristle Face with a sequel, Sputters (1963), in which Jase raises a new foxhound, Sputters. The book also follows Lute as he becomes sheriff, takes a bride, and tries to provide a real home for Jase. Bristle Face was later adapted for television and aired on 26 January and 2 February 1964 as a two-part entry on Walt Disney's Wonderful World of Color with Phillip Alford as Jase Landers, Brian Keith as Lute Swank and Wallace Ford as Emory Packer.

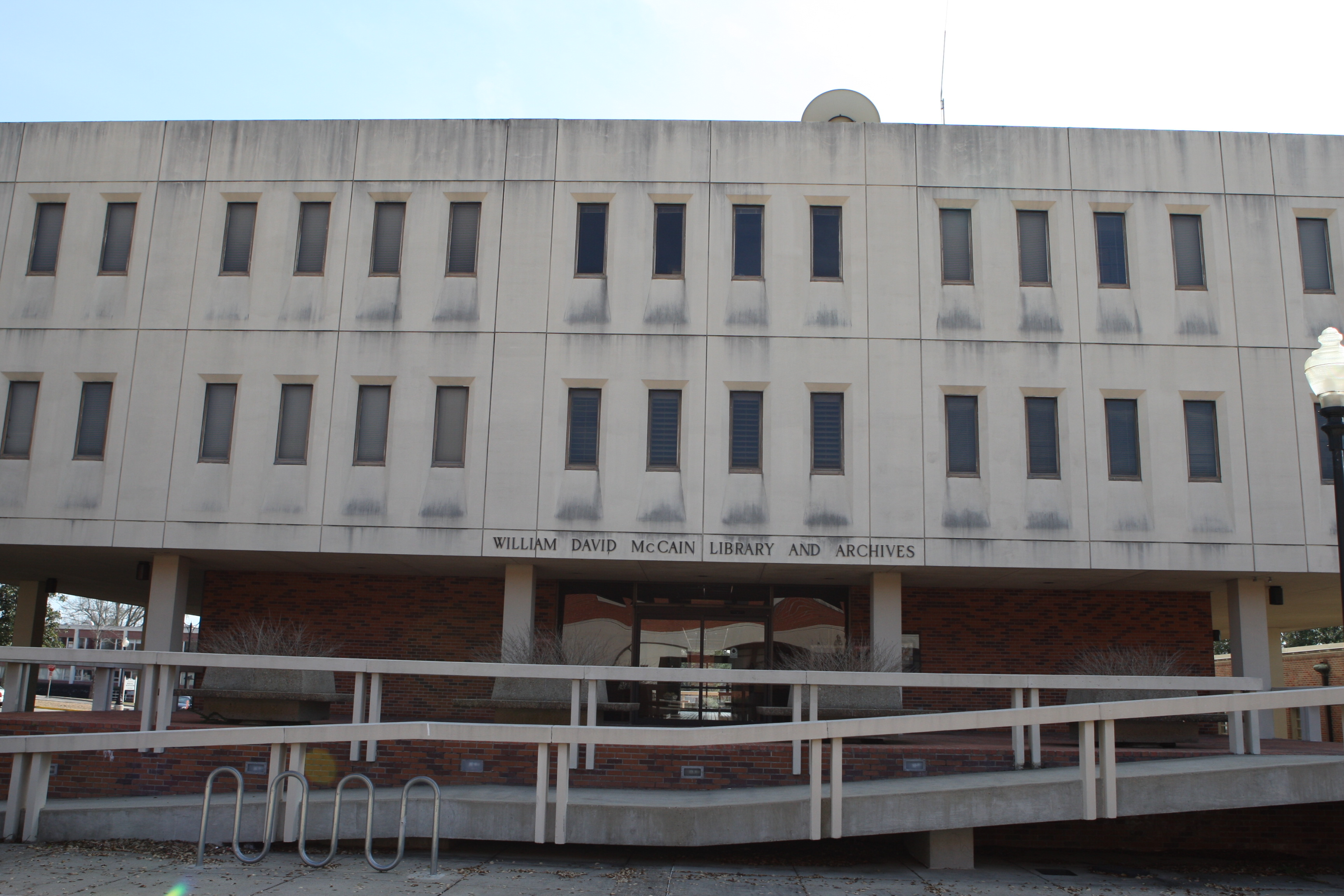
The McCain Library on the campus of the University of Southern Mississippi houses part of Master's literary collection.

== Later life ==
In the mid-1960s, Masters and his son founded Joe Panther Enterprises, a non-profit mail order business supplying audio recordings of Ball's lively renderings of his stories to foster good reading habits in young children. The company also offered children the opportunity to join the Joe Panther Fan Club which included membership cards, reader's award, and a reading pledge card. The company was based in Miami, Florida, Ball's home for several years. Seeking a drier climate, he and his wife moved to Roswell, New Mexico in 1971 and in recognition of his career, Roswell declared November 2, 1976 Zachary Ball Day. With a donation of a portion of his works and papers, the "Zachary Ball Children's Book Collection Room" was dedicated at the Ward Edwards Library at Central Missouri State University (now the University of Central Missouri) in Warrensburg, Missouri in April 1978. Central Missouri's collection of Ball's works are part of the Philip A. Sadler Research Collection of Literature for Children and Young Adults in the James C. Kirkpatrick Library. In the mid-1980s, Masters donated the remainder of his collection of literary papers, publications, correspondence, photographs, audio recordings, and business records created and accumulated by himself and his son between 1944 and 1983 to the University of Southern Mississippi. "The Zachary Ball Papers" in the de Grummond Children's Literature Collection were created primarily from his composition of nineteen published and unpublished works and the operation of Joe Panther Enterprises. Masters died in 1987 in Roswell, New Mexico, and his son died in 1995.

== Selected works ==
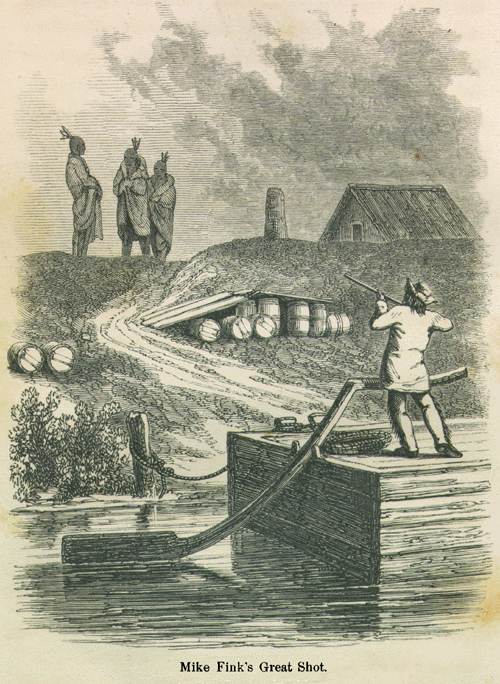
Mike Fink's youth was one of Ball's many subjects.

=== Books ===
Short synopses of the following books were pulled from the University of Southern Mississippi's de Grummond Children's Literature Collection and the University of Central Missouri's Philip A. Sadler Research Collection of Literature for Children and Young Adults card catalogs.

- Pull Down to New Orleans (1945)
- Piney (1950) - An orphaned 15-year-old boy is taken in to work on a farm in Mississippi. There he experiences abuse and runs away to Louisiana with the help of his cousin, Duff.
- Joe Panther (1950) - In an endeavor to earn money for school, an industrious Seminole becomes a deck hand on a tourist boat and accidentally is involved in a smuggling ring.
- Swamp Chief (1952) - Through the eyes of a young man, the traditional lifestyle of the Seminole Indian and the vicissitudes of modern existence are recounted. This book is a sequel to Joe Panther.
- The Secret Forest (1953) - A young boy in Mississippi copes with his father's death with the help of his beloved hound.
- Bar Pilot (1955) - A young boy suffering from amnesia joins through crew of an 1800s sailboat plying the Mississippi River delta.
- Skin Diver (1956) - Two young skin divers are hired to help a researching biochemist working off the coast of Florida.
- Keelboat Journey (1958) - The fictional adventure of the Tomahawk, the first keelboat to reach the headwaters of the Missouri River in 1831 and establish a permanent trading post in the Oregon territory as seen through the eyes of Garth Madden, the youngest member of the Tomahawk's crew.
- Young Mike Fink (1958) - A fictional account of the youth and manhood of Mike Fink, whose feats as a keelboat man, hunter, fighter, and boaster inspired legends for a nation growing up in the early 19th century.
- North to Abilene (1960) - An orphaned frontier lad and his pet bull meet up with a rancher who teaches the boy to ride, rope, shoot and to become a Texas cattleman.
- Salvage Diver (1961) - Two Seminole youths and their boat are hired for the summer by two men who want to search for sunken ships off the Florida Keys.
- Kep (1961) - After a family tragedy, a boy starts a new life with a couple who have a serious personal problem of their own to contend with.
- Bristle Face (1962) - Half-dog, half porcupine in appearance, Bristle Face becomes an outstanding hunting dog and a good friend of the fourteen-year-old orphan boy who adopts him.
- Sputters (1963) - A dog proves his worth in a badger fight, a dog fight, and in the sheriff's hunt for moonshiners. This book is a sequel to Bristle Face.
- Tent Show (1964) - Originally called Curtain Call. Based on the author's youthful experiences in a traveling tent show, this story of a young comedian and his performing dog portrays the life of traveling entertainers in early 20th century America.
- Wilderness Teacher (1965) - one of Masters' few books with a female lead character
- Sky Diver (1967) - A Seminole Indian uses ancient Indian methods combined with the latest scientific advances to save his home in the Everglades.

=== Short stories ===
Ball wrote more than 100 short stories over his writing career. From 1944 to 1961, he had over 70 of these stories, plus a portion of his novel Pull Down To New Orleans, printed in various publications including: Hometown, Saturday Evening Post, Esquire, Real Western, Junior Scholastic, Liberty, The Blue Book Magazine, Frontier Stories, Modern Romances, Today’s Woman, Love Novels, Twelve Fifteen, Junior Life, Dell Western Adventure Comics, Collier's, Authors and Journalists, Junior Life, and Boys' Life.

=== Collected papers ===
- Zachary Ball Papers, de Grummond Children's Literature Collection, University of Southern Mississippi
- Zachary Ball Papers: Philip A. Sadler Research Collection of Literature for Children and Young Adults, James C. Kirkpatrick Library, University of Central Missouri
