= Marion Township, Missouri =

Marion Township is the name of 11 townships in the U.S. state of Missouri:

- Marion Township, Buchanan County, Missouri
- Marion Township, Cole County, Missouri
- Marion Township, Dade County, Missouri
- Marion Township, Daviess County, Missouri
- Marion Township, Grundy County, Missouri
- Marion Township, Harrison County, Missouri
- Marion Township, Jasper County, Missouri
- Marion Township, Mercer County, Missouri
- Marion Township, Monroe County, Missouri
- Marion Township, Newton County, Missouri
- Marion Township, St. Francois County, Missouri

Marion Township also appears in the following 4 townships (all in Polk County, Missouri):

- Northeast Marion Township
- Northwest Marion Township
- Southeast Marion Township
- Southwest Marion Township

== See also ==
- Marion Township (disambiguation)
