= Woods Creek (Weldon River tributary) =

Stream in the U.S. state of Missouri

Coordinates: 40°12′11″N 93°37′15″W

Woods Creek is a stream in Grundy and Mercer counties in the U.S. state of Missouri. It is a tributary of the Weldon River.

Woods Creek (also historically called "Wood Creek") most likely was named for the trees lining its banks.

== See also ==
- List of rivers of Missouri
