= Missouri Route 128 =

State highway in Missouri, U.S.

Route 128
- MO 128 highlighted in red

Route information
- Maintained by MoDOT
- Length: 1.215 mi (1.955 km)

Major junctions
- South end: Route 146 west of Trenton
- North end: Crowder State Park

Location
- Country: United States
- State: Missouri

Highway system
- Missouri State Highway System; Interstate; US; State; Supplemental
| ← Route 127 | → Route 129 |

Route 128 is a short highway in Grundy County. Its northern terminus is at Crowder State Park northwest of Trenton; its southern terminus is less than three miles (5 km) south at Route 146. Despite being an even number, which normally runs east-west in Missouri, Route 128 is a north-south highway.

== Route description ==
Route 128 begins at an intersection with Route 146 west of Trenton, heading north as a two-lane undivided road. The route runs through forested areas of Crowder State Park, passing to the west of Crowder Lake. Route 128 curves west and reaches its northern terminus within the state park.

== Major intersections ==
The entire route is in Grundy County.

| Location | mi | km | Destinations | Notes |
|---|---|---|---|---|
| Trenton | 0.000 | 0.000 | Route 146 | |
| Crowder State Park | 1.215 | 1.955 | End of state maintenance | |
1.000 mi = 1.609 km; 1.000 km = 0.621 mi
