= Leisure Lake, Missouri =

- Census-designated place
- Location within Missouri Location within the United States
- Coordinates: 40°6′29″N 93°43′37″W
- Country: United States
- State: Missouri
- County: Grundy

Area
  - Total: 1.46 sq mi (3.79 km^{2})
  - Land: 1.39 sq mi (3.60 km^{2})
  - Water: 0.073 sq mi (0.19 km^{2})
- Elevation: 846 ft (258 m)

Population (2020)
  - Total: 166
  - Density: 119.3/sq mi (46.08/km^{2})
- Time zone: UTC-6 (Central (CST))
  - Summer (DST): UTC-5 (CDT)
- ZIP code: 64683
- Area code: 660
- FIPS code: 29-41417
- GNIS feature ID: 2587087

Leisure Lake is an unincorporated community and census-designated place (CDP) in Grundy County, Missouri, United States. As of the 2020 census, the population was 166.

It is located in western Grundy County and consists of a residential community set round a reservoir named Leisure Lake. Missouri Route 146 forms the eastern and northern edge of the CDP and leads southeast 8 miles (13 km) to Trenton, the Grundy County seat.

According to the U.S. Census Bureau, the Leisure Lake CDP has a total area of 1.5 square miles (3.8 km^{2}), of which 1.4 square miles (3.6 km^{2}) is land and 0.1 square miles (0.2 km^{2}), or 5.10%, is water.

== Demographics ==
Historical population
Census	Pop.	Note	%±
2020	166		—
U.S. Decennial Census
