= Peteet Creek =

Stream in the U.S. state of Missouri

Coordinates: 40°12′37″N 93°44′20″W

Peteet Creek is a stream in Grundy and Mercer Counties in the U.S. state of Missouri. It is a tributary of the Thompson River.

Peteet Creek most likely was named after the local Peteet family.

== See also ==
- List of rivers of Missouri
