= Trenton Township =

Trenton Township may refer to:

- Trenton Township, Henry County, Iowa
- Trenton Township, Edwards County, Kansas
- Trenton Township, Grundy County, Missouri
- Trenton Township, New Jersey, historical, now mostly in Trenton city
- Trenton Township, Williams County, North Dakota; see Williams County, North Dakota
- Trenton Township, Delaware County, Ohio
- Trenton Township, Brookings County, South Dakota; see Brookings County, South Dakota

== See also ==
- Trenton (disambiguation)
