= Trenton High School =

Trenton High School may refer to:

- Trenton High School (Florida), Trenton, Florida, US
- Trenton High School (Trenton, Iowa), Listed on the National Register of Historic Places in Grundy County, Iowa
- Trenton High School (Michigan), Trenton, Michigan, US
- Trenton High School (Missouri), the current high school in Trenton, Missouri, US
- Trenton High School (Trenton, Missouri), the former high school, a historic building
- Trenton High School (Nova Scotia), Trenton, Nova Scotia, Canada
- Trenton High School (Ontario), Trenton, Ontario, Canada
- Trenton High School (Texas), Trenton, Texas, US
- Trenton Central High School, Trenton, New Jersey, US
- Trenton Central High School West, Trenton, New Jersey, US
