= Hickory Creek (Thompson River tributary) =

Stream in the U.S. state of Missouri

Hickory Creek is a stream in Daviess and Grundy counties of the U.S. state of Missouri. It is a tributary of the Thompson River.

The stream headwaters arise in Daviess County approximately 1.5 miles northeast of Jamesport adjacent to Missouri Route 6. The stream flows to the northeast and north parallel to the county line and turns to the southeast as it enters Grundy County. It flows past the community of Hickory Creek and enters the Thompson River about one mile north of the Grundy-Livingston county line. The headwaters are at 39°59′25″N 93°47′21″W and the confluence with the Thompson is at 39°59′25″N 93°37′21″W.

Hickory Creek was named for the hickory timber lining its course.

== See also ==
- List of rivers of Missouri
