= WPA Stock Barn and Pavilion =

- U.S. National Register of Historic Places
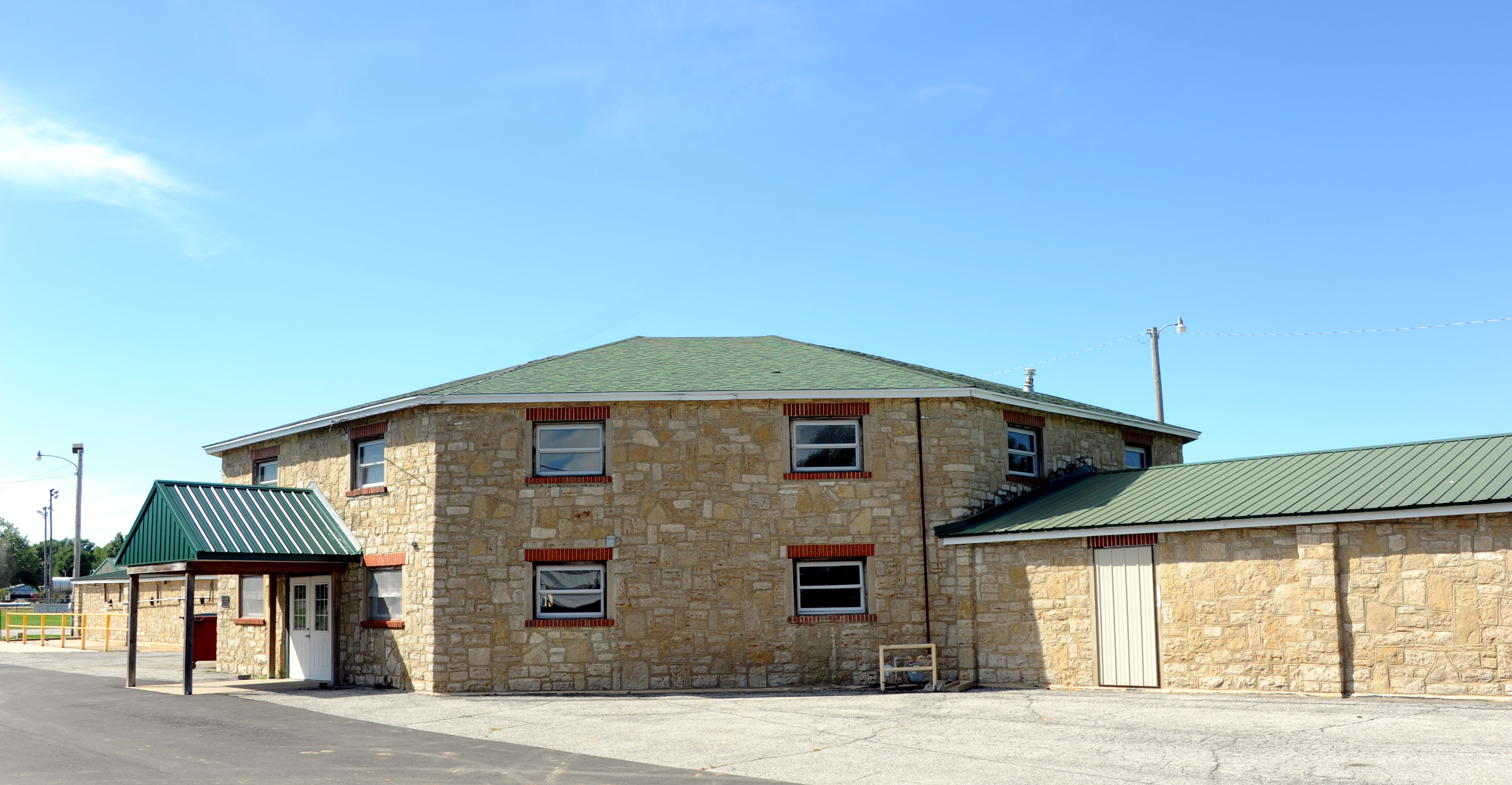

- Location within Missouri Location within the United States
- Location: Oklahoma St. at Eastside Park, Trenton, Missouri
- Coordinates: 40°4′41″N 93°35′59″W
- Area: less than one acre
- Built: 1938
- Architect: Ashley G. Knight, WPA
- NRHP reference No.: 94000314
- Added to NRHP: April 25, 1994

WPA Stock Barn and Pavilion, also known as the Rock Barn, is a historic barn and pavilion located at Trenton, Grundy County, Missouri. It was built in 1938 as a Works Progress Administration project. It consists of a two-story, octagonal barn with attached one-story stock pens. The building is constructed of native stone on a concrete foundation. The building served as a livestock housing and sales pavilion for the annual Grundy County agricultural fair.

It was listed on the National Register of Historic Places in 1994.
