= Myers Township, Grundy County, Missouri =

Township in the U.S. state of Missouri

Coordinates: 40.23°N 93.43°W

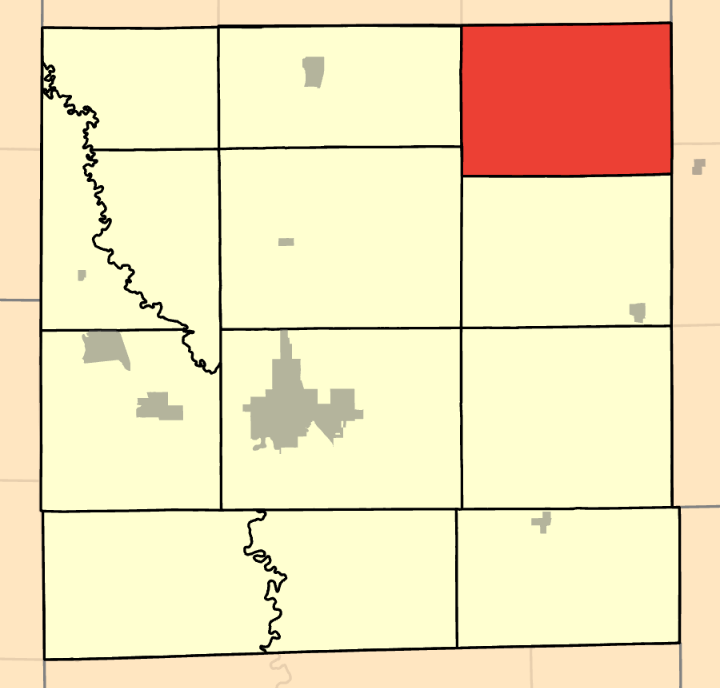

Myers Township is a township in Grundy County, in the U.S. state of Missouri.

Myers Township was established in 1872, and named after Lewis and Milton Myers, pioneer citizens.
