= Harrison Township, Grundy County, Missouri =

Civil ownship in the American state of Missouri

Coordinates: 40.1641891°N 93.6846546°W

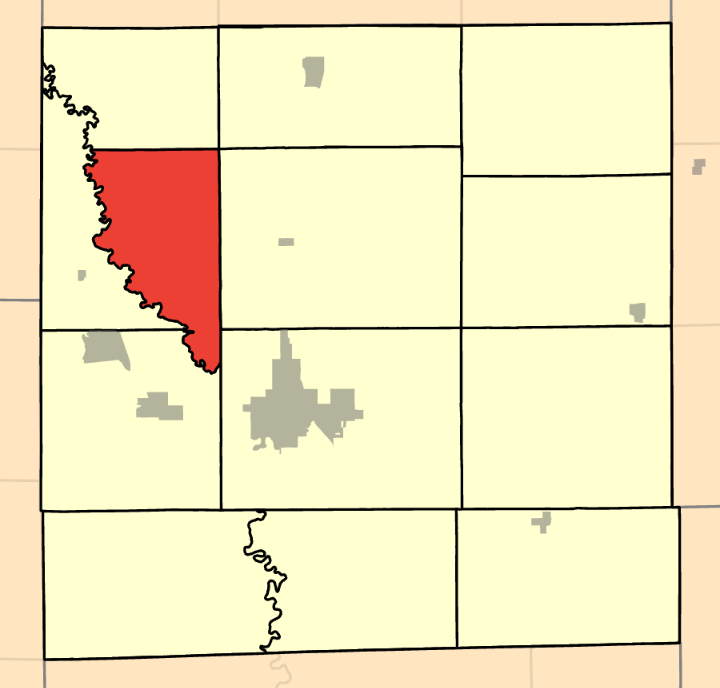

Harrison Township is a township in Grundy County, in the U.S. state of Missouri.

Harrison Township has the name of William Henry Harrison, 9th President of the United States.
