= Marion Township, Grundy County, Missouri =

Township in the U.S. state of Missouri

Coordinates: 40.1222°N 93.5558°W

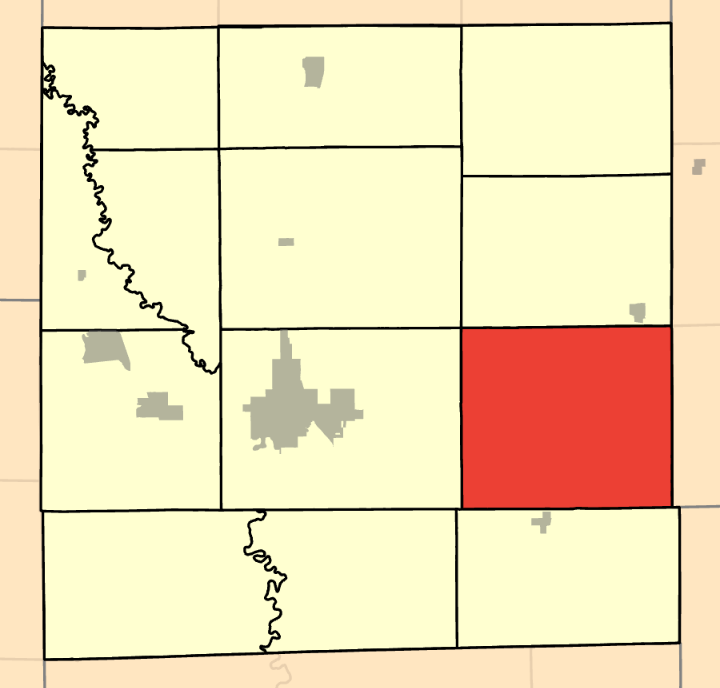

Marion Township is a township in Grundy County, in the U.S. state of Missouri.

Dunlap is located in the northwest of Marion Township. The Grand River traverses from the northeast corner of this township to the south center.
