= Buttsville, Missouri =

Unincorporated community in Missouri, U.S.

Coordinates: 40°12′46″N 93°40′17″W

Buttsville is an unincorporated community in Grundy County, Missouri, United States.

== History ==
A Mr. Wright had a post office and some living in his home were named Butts. Eventually, the place became known as Buttsville. A post office was established as Buttsville in 1855, and remained in operation until it was discontinued in 1902. When the railroad was built through Grundy County but bypassed Buttsville, the community declined in importance.
