= St. Philip's Episcopal Church (Trenton, Missouri) =

Historic church in Missouri, United States

- U.S. National Register of Historic Places
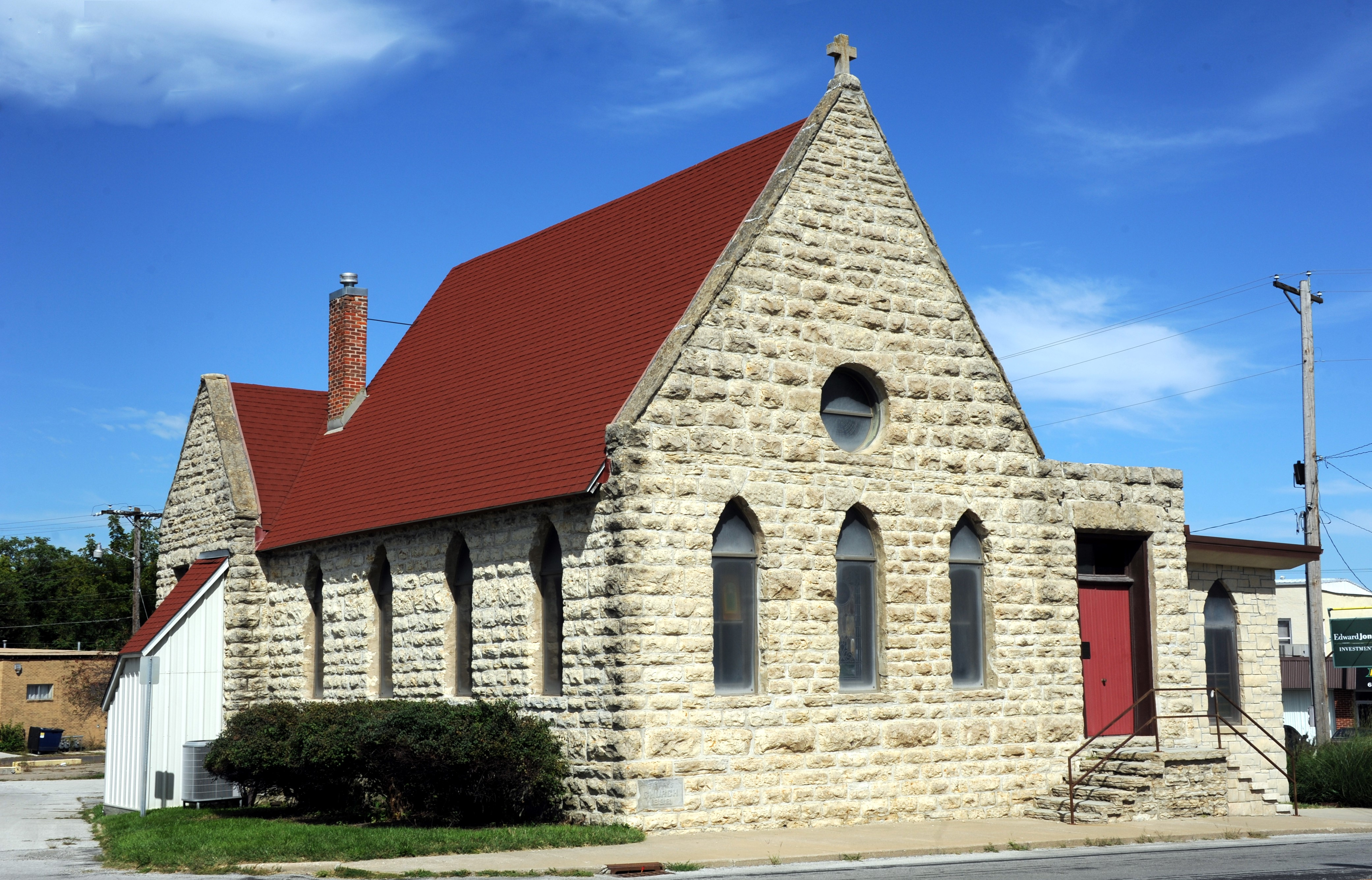

- Location within Missouri Location within the United States
- Location: 141 E. 9th St. Trenton, Missouri
- Coordinates: 40°4′25″N 93°37′0″W
- Area: less than one acre
- Built: 1898
- Architectural style: Gothic
- NRHP reference No.: 79001361
- Added to NRHP: July 17, 1979

St. Philip's Episcopal Church is a historic Episcopal church located at 141 E. 9th Street in Trenton, Grundy County, Missouri.

== History ==
It was built in 1898.

== Description ==
It is a small, one-story, Gothic Revival style limestone building. It has a high gable on the primary facade, a clerestoried chancel with projecting polygonal apse, and locally crafted windows of colored cathedral glass.

It was listed on the National Register of Historic Places in 1979.
