= Madison Township, Grundy County, Missouri =

Township in the American state of Missouri

Coordinates: 40.073639°N 93.709465°W

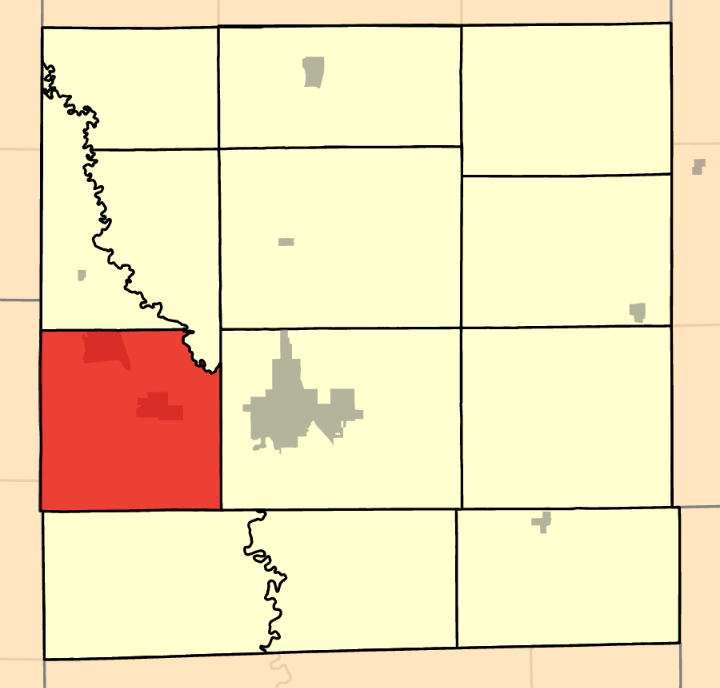

Madison Township is a township in Grundy County, in the U.S. state of Missouri.

Madison Township was originally called Sugar Creek Township, and the latter name was established in 1837. The present name, after President James Madison, was adopted in 1839.
