= Trenton Historic District =

Trenton Historic District may refer to:

- Downtown Trenton Commercial Historic District, New Jersey, listed on the NRHP in Mercer County
- Trenton Ferry Historic District, New Jersey, listed on the NRHP in Mercer County
- Trenton Historic District (Trenton, North Carolina), listed on the NRHP in Jones County
- Trenton Historic District (Trenton, Tennessee), listed on the NRHP in Gibson County

== See also ==
- Trenton (disambiguation)
