= I Stole a Million =

1939 film by Frank Tuttle

- Directed by: Frank Tuttle
- Written by: Lester Cole; Nathanael West
- Produced by: Burt Kelly
- Starring: George Raft; Claire Trevor; Dick Foran; Victor Jory
- Cinematography: Milton R. Krasner
- Edited by: Edward Curtiss
- Music by: Ralph Freed; Charles Previn; Frank Skinner
- Production company: Universal Pictures
- Distributed by: Universal Pictures
- Release date: 1 August 1939 (United States)
- Running time: 80 minutes
- Country: United States
- Language: English

I Stole a Million is a 1939 film noir crime film starring George Raft as a cab driver turned small-time crook who makes a big score and lives to regret it. The supporting cast includes Claire Trevor, Dick Foran, and Victor Jory. The movie was written by Nathanael West based on a story idea by Lester Cole, which in turn was based on the life story of bank robber Roy Gardner. It was directed by Frank Tuttle, and released by Universal Pictures.

== Plot ==
Taxi driver Joe Lourik gets into an argument with a finance company over payments owed on his new cab. Believing that he has been cheated, Joe reclaims his payments but is arrested for robbery. Escaping with a pair of handcuffs still attached, he jumps on a passing freight train where he meets a tramp who tells him to see Patian, a thief and a fence in San Diego, who can also remove his handcuffs. After meeting Patian, it is agreed that he will remove the cuffs on the condition that Joe drive the getaway car for a bank robbery. After the robbery, Patian sends Joe north to a boarding house in Sacramento to wait for his share of the take, but the boarding house owner informs Joe that Patian isn't good for the money.

Desperate for bus fare to return to San Diego to get his money from Patian, Joe considers robbing the cash register of the empty storefront of a downtown Sacramento flower shop. Once in the store, clerk Laura Benson emerges from the backroom before Joe can rob the register. Joe falls in love immediately and decides to go straight. With his winnings from a crap game, Joe buys a garage in Amesville and settles down, however, within a year, the police are on his trail. Joe then travels to San Diego to demand his money from Patian, but Patian's thugs force Joe to rob a post office. Desperate, and afraid that he will be caught if he returns home, Joe disappears.

Some time later, Joe sees a picture of his newborn baby in the newspaper and meets with Laura, who pleads with Joe to give himself up and serve his time so that he can continue his new life. Hearing footsteps, Joe flees from the police who have followed Laura, and Laura is arrested and jailed as an accomplice.

While Laura is in jail, Joe comes up with a plan to steal enough money to make Laura and his daughter financially secure, and he embarks on a robbing spree which earns him the moniker of "the Million Dollar Bandit." After serving her sentence, Laura manages to meet with Joe. She again pleads with him to give himself up, and as the police surround them, Joe has no other choice but to do so.

== Cast ==
- George Raft as Joe Lourik
- Claire Trevor as Laura Benson
- Dick Foran as Paul Carver
- Victor Jory as Patton
- Joe Sawyer as Billings
- Robert Elliott as Peterson
- Tom Fadden as Verne
- Emory Parnell as Friendly Cop

== Development ==
Lester Cole wrote the original screen story based on the non-fiction article "Roy Gardner's Own Story", by former bank robber Roy Gardner, J. Campbell Bruce, and James G. Chestnutt, which was published in the San Francisco Call Bulletin in 1938. In January 1939 Nathanael West was assigned to do a script based on Cole's story. West came up with a treatment which prompted Joseph Breen, then Director of the Production Code Administration, to declare that while his office had handled roughly 3,600 texts over the year, "it is our unanimous judgment, here in this office, that this new treatment by Mr. West is, by far, the best piece of craftsmanship in screen adaptation that we have seen – certainly, in a year."

George Raft signed to make the film in April 1939. Raft had been reluctant to play crooked characters but he had left Paramount and wanted to keep his standing as a box-office star. He would shortly sign a long-term contract with Warner Bros.

Claire Trevor was borrowed from 20th Century Fox. Edward Ludwig was to direct but was replaced by Frank Tuttle. Filming started in May.

== Reception ==
The film garnered favorable reviews, particularly for its script, which Variety called "strongly motivated". A reviewer for The Hollywood Reporter wrote, "it is a story which will exert pulse-quickening effect on audiences of both sexes... plot structure and pithy dialogue are all to the play's advantage."

However the movie was a box office flop.

In his 1970 book, Nathanael West: The Art of His Life, biographer Jay Martin wrote of the film: "Raft's ambitions innocently enmesh him with the law. From that minor infraction, he becomes involved in a bank holdup but tries to go straight when he falls in love with Claire Trevor. Finding the law on his trail and needing a stake for a small town hideaway, he knocks over a post office. With the money, he buys a village garage and settles down happily... With a baby in the offing the law picks up his trail again... His warped mind sends him through a series of holdups... to gain enough plunder to provide for his wife and baby. But even that, he finds, is a mirage, and he prefers death from the guns of pursuing officers than face a prison term.
