= Washington Township, Grundy County, Missouri =

Township in the American state of Missouri

Coordinates: 40.24°N 93.73°W

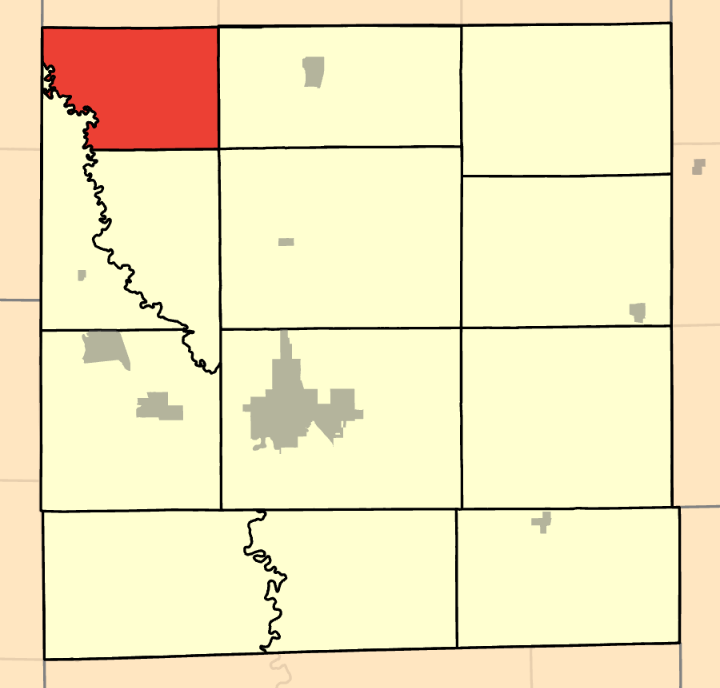

Washington Township is a township in Grundy County, in the U.S. state of Missouri.

Washington Township was established in 1841.
