= Taylor Township, Grundy County, Missouri =

Township in the American state of Missouri

Coordinates: 40.15°N 93.73°W

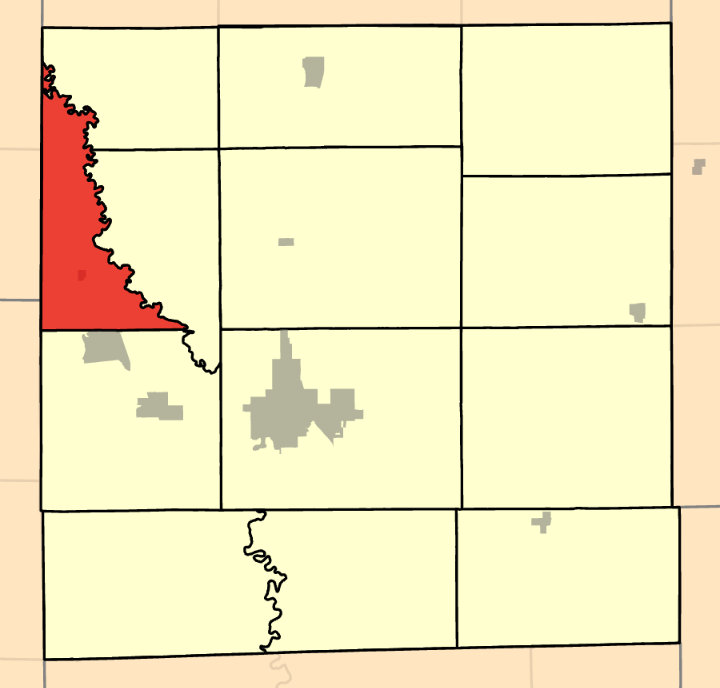

Taylor Township is a township in Grundy County, in the U.S. state of Missouri.

Taylor Township was established in 1872, taking its name from President Zachary Taylor.
