= Franklin Township, Grundy County, Missouri =

Township in the American state of Missouri

Coordinates: 40.2355983°N 93.5758638°W

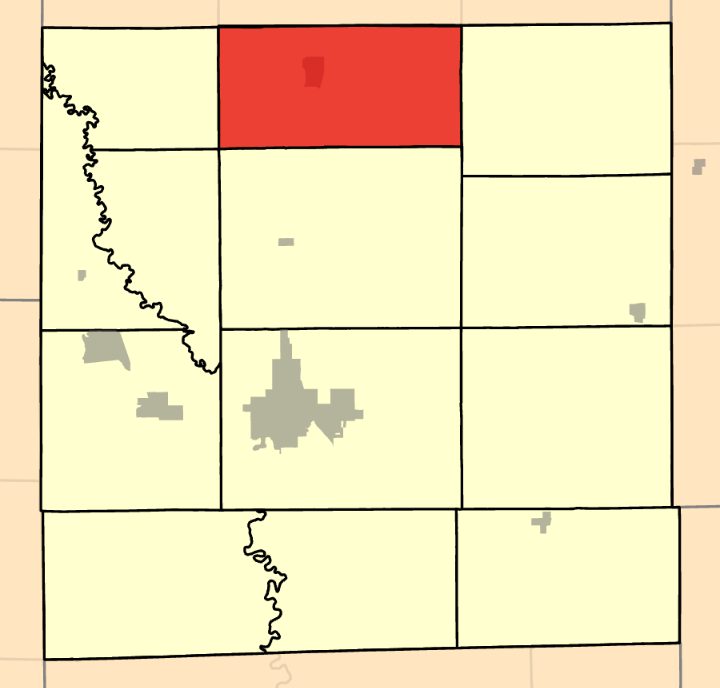

Franklin Township is a township in Grundy County, in the U.S. state of Missouri.

Franklin Township was established in 1841, taking its name from Benjamin Franklin.
