= Wilson Township, Grundy County, Missouri =

Township in the American state of Missouri

Coordinates: 40.00°N 93.44°W

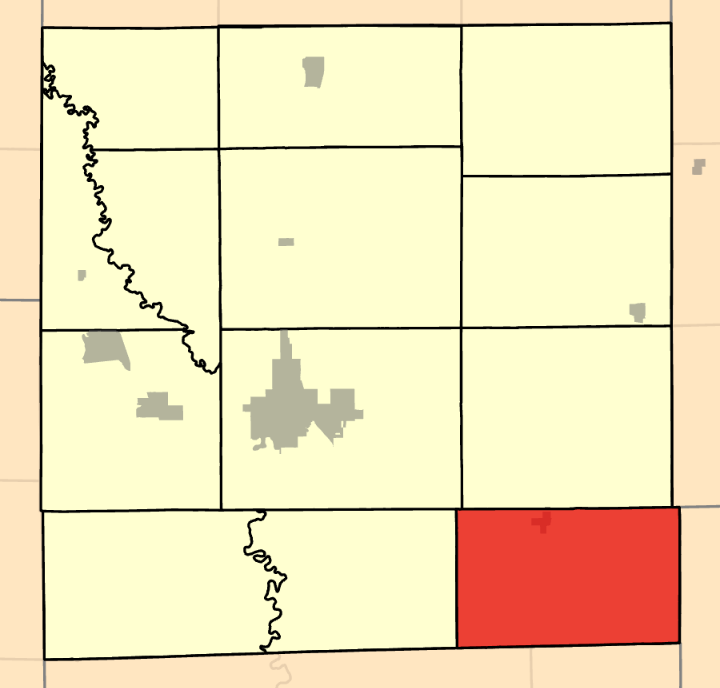

Wilson Township is a township in Grundy County, in the U.S. state of Missouri.

Wilson Township was established in 1872.
