= Plaza Hotel (Trenton, Missouri) =

- U.S. National Register of Historic Places
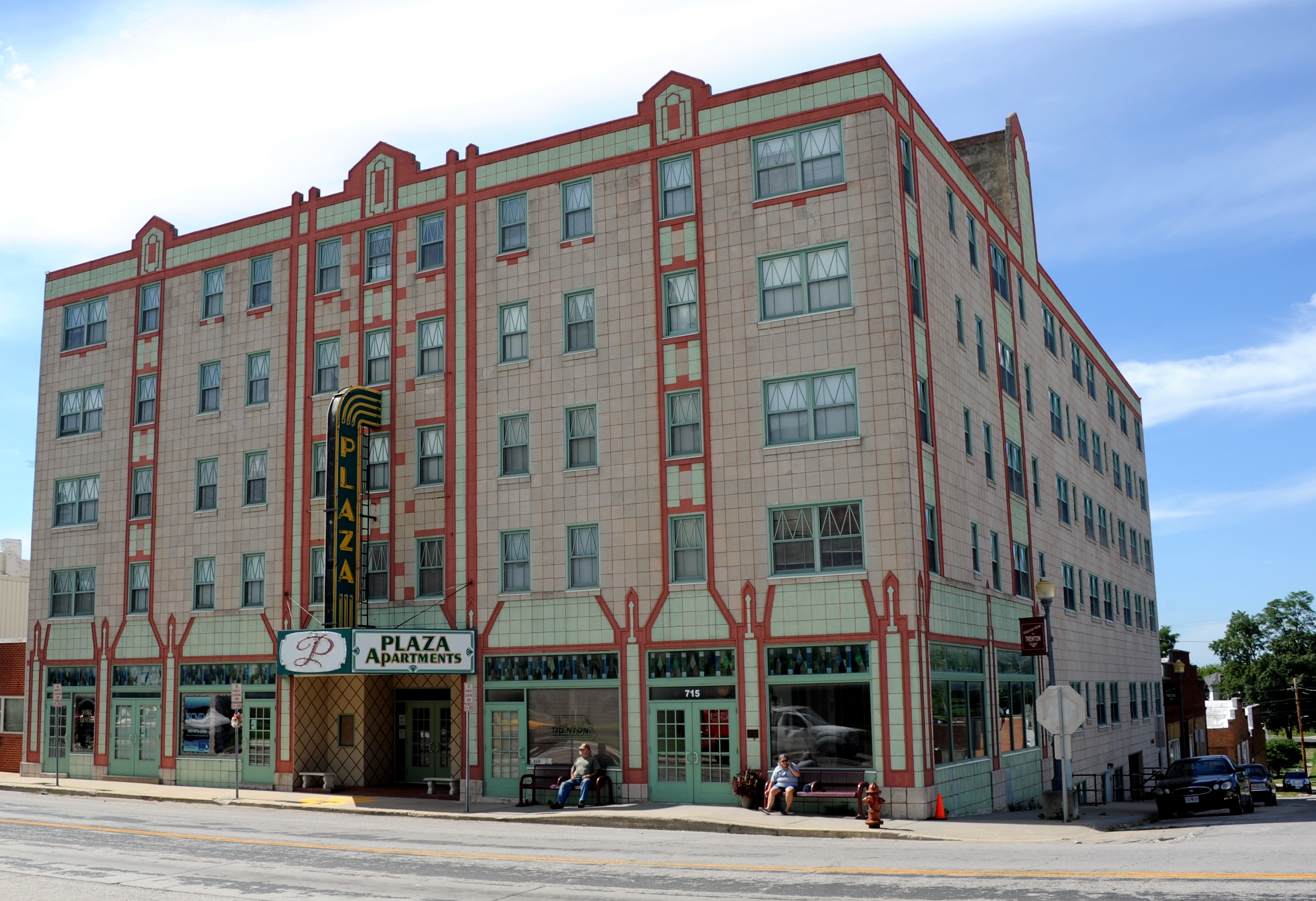

- Location within Missouri Location within the United States
- Location: 715 Main St. Trenton, Missouri
- Coordinates: 40°4′27″N 93°37′8″W
- Area: less than one acre
- Built: 1929-1930
- Built by: B.L. Hoffman
- Architect: Jens C. Pederson
- Architectural style: Art Deco
- NRHP reference No.: 01000010
- Added to NRHP: July 18, 2001

Plaza Hotel is a historic hotel building located at Trenton, Grundy County, Missouri. It was built in 1929–1930, and is a five-story, Art Deco style reinforced concrete building. The building measures approximately 10,912 square feet (1,013.8 m^{2}) It has a pre-cast, concrete block exterior, concrete roof and floors.

It was listed on the National Register of Historic Places in 2001.
