= Trenton Township, Grundy County, Missouri =

Township in the American state of Missouri

Coordinates: 40.07°N 93.57°W

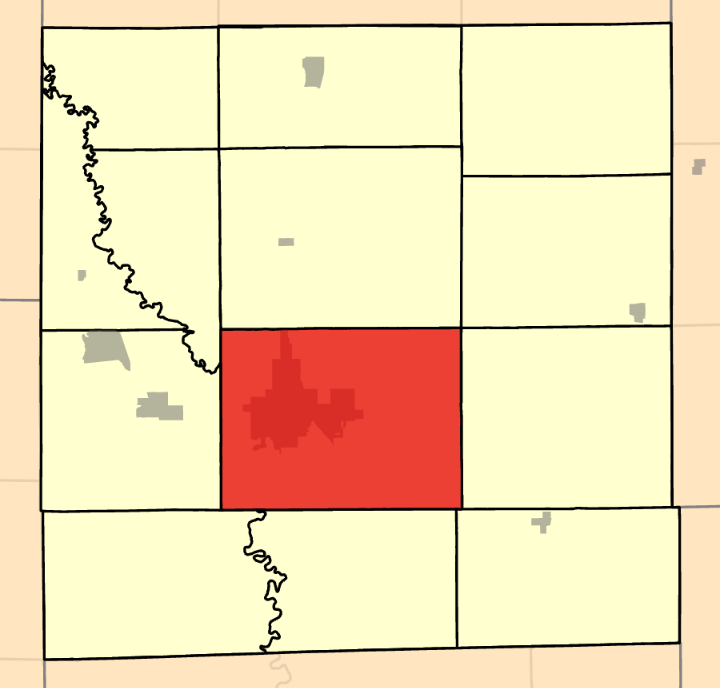

Trenton Township is a township in Grundy County, in the U.S. state of Missouri.

Trenton Township was established in 1872, and named after the community of the same name within its borders.
