= Alpha, Missouri =

Unincorporated community in Missouri, U.S.

Coordinates: 39°59′07″N 93°25′16″W

Alpha is an unincorporated community in Grundy County, in the U.S. state of Missouri.

== History ==
The town of Alpha, first called Lickskillet, came into existence circa 1850 when a store was opened by Samuel Dunham. At one point the town grew to a population of 200 and had a grocery store, two blacksmith shops, a dry goods store, two drug stores, a water-powered mill, a furniture factory, and four doctors.

In 1887, the Chicago Milwaukee St. Paul Railroad Company established the town of Laredo on the west side of Medicine Creek, bypassing Alpha on the east side of the creek. This railway division point, midway between Kansas City and Ottumwa, Iowa, dictated that jobs and prosperity would come to Laredo instead of Alpha. This caused Alpha citizens and businesses to relocate to Laredo. Ultimately, the Alpha Post Office was closed in 1904.
