= Spickard, Missouri =

City in Grundy County, Missouri, United States

- City
- Location of Spickard, Missouri
- Coordinates: 40°14′38″N 93°35′32″W
- Country: United States
- State: Missouri
- County: Grundy

Area
  - Total: 0.63 sq mi (1.64 km^{2})
  - Land: 0.63 sq mi (1.64 km^{2})
  - Water: 0 sq mi (0.00 km^{2})
- Elevation: 853 ft (260 m)

Population (2020)
  - Total: 222
  - Density: 351.7/sq mi (135.78/km^{2})
- Time zone: UTC-6 (Central (CST))
  - Summer (DST): UTC-5 (CDT)
- ZIP code: 64679
- Area code: 660
- FIPS code: 29-69464
- GNIS feature ID: 2395926

Spickard is a city on the Weldon River in Grundy County, Missouri, United States. The population was 222 at the 2020 census.

== History ==
Spickard was originally called Spickardsville, and under the latter name was platted in 1871 by G. A. Spickard, and named for him. A post office called Spickardsville was established in 1872, and the name was changed to Spickard in 1892.

== Geography ==
Spickard is located 1.5 miles south of the Grundy-Mercer county line along Missouri Route C just west of U.S. Route 65 and adjacent to the Weldon River.

According to the United States Census Bureau, the city has a total area of 0.63 square miles (1.63 km^{2}), all land.

== Demographics ==
Historical population
| Census | Pop. | Note | %± |
|---|---|---|---|
| 1880 | 330 | | — |
| 1890 | 481 | | 45.8% |
| 1900 | 584 | | 21.4% |
| 1910 | 638 | | 9.2% |
| 1920 | 731 | | 14.6% |
| 1930 | 569 | | −22.2% |
| 1940 | 587 | | 3.2% |
| 1950 | 517 | | −11.9% |
| 1960 | 450 | | −13.0% |
| 1970 | 408 | | −9.3% |
| 1980 | 389 | | −4.7% |
| 1990 | 326 | | −16.2% |
| 2000 | 315 | | −3.4% |
| 2010 | 254 | | −19.4% |
| 2020 | 222 | | −12.6% |
U.S. Decennial Census

=== 2010 census ===
As of the census of 2010, there were 254 people, 112 households, and 68 families residing in the city. The population density was 403.2 inhabitants per square mile (155.7/km^{2}). There were 148 housing units at an average density of 234.9 per square mile (90.7/km^{2}). The racial makeup of the city was 98.4% White, 0.4% from other races, and 1.2% from two or more races. Hispanic or Latino of any race were 1.6% of the population.

There were 112 households, of which 29.5% had children under the age of 18 living with them, 42.9% were married couples living together, 12.5% had a female householder with no husband present, 5.4% had a male householder with no wife present, and 39.3% were non-families. 32.1% of all households were made up of individuals, and 12.5% had someone living alone who was 65 years of age or older. The average household size was 2.27 and the average family size was 2.75.

The median age in the city was 41 years. 23.2% of residents were under the age of 18; 9.8% were between the ages of 18 and 24; 20.8% were from 25 to 44; 28.7% were from 45 to 64; and 17.3% were 65 years of age or older. The gender makeup of the city was 50.0% male and 50.0% female.

=== 2000 census ===
As of the census of 2000, there were 315 people, 142 households, and 78 families residing in the city. The population density was 497.5 inhabitants per square mile (192.1/km^{2}). There were 162 housing units at an average density of 255.9 per square mile (98.8/km^{2}). The racial makeup of the city was 97.46% White, 0.32% Asian, and 2.22% from two or more races. Hispanic or Latino of any race were 0.95% of the population.

There were 142 households, out of which 26.8% had children under the age of 18 living with them, 43.0% were married couples living together, 9.9% had a female householder with no husband present, and 44.4% were non-families. 37.3% of all households were made up of individuals, and 16.9% had someone living alone who was 65 years of age or older. The average household size was 2.22 and the average family size was 2.96.

In the city the population was spread out, with 27.3% under the age of 18, 6.7% from 18 to 24, 30.8% from 25 to 44, 20.3% from 45 to 64, and 14.9% who were 65 years of age or older. The median age was 38 years. For every 100 females, there were 88.6 males. For every 100 females age 18 and over, there were 84.7 males.

The median income for a household in the city was $18,194, and the median income for a family was $17,059. Males had a median income of $19,583 versus $16,875 for females. The per capita income for the city was $12,761. About 40.9% of families and 40.4% of the population were below the poverty line, including 57.3% of those under the age of 18 and 29.8% of those 65 and older.

== See also ==
- List of cities in Missouri
