= Weldon River =

River in Iowa and Missouri, U.S.

Coordinates: 40°06′06″N 93°38′55″W

Weldon River is stream in Clark and Decatur counties in southern Iowa and Grundy and Mercer counties in northern Missouri in the United States. It is a tributary of the Thompson River. The confluence is two miles (3.2 km) northwest of Trenton. It has an average discharge of 246 cubic feet per second at Mill Grove.

Weldon River most likely was named after James Weldon, a pioneer settler.

== Tributaries ==
- Woods Creek

== See also ==
- List of rivers in Iowa
- List of rivers in Missouri
