= Jewett Norris Library =

- U.S. National Register of Historic Places
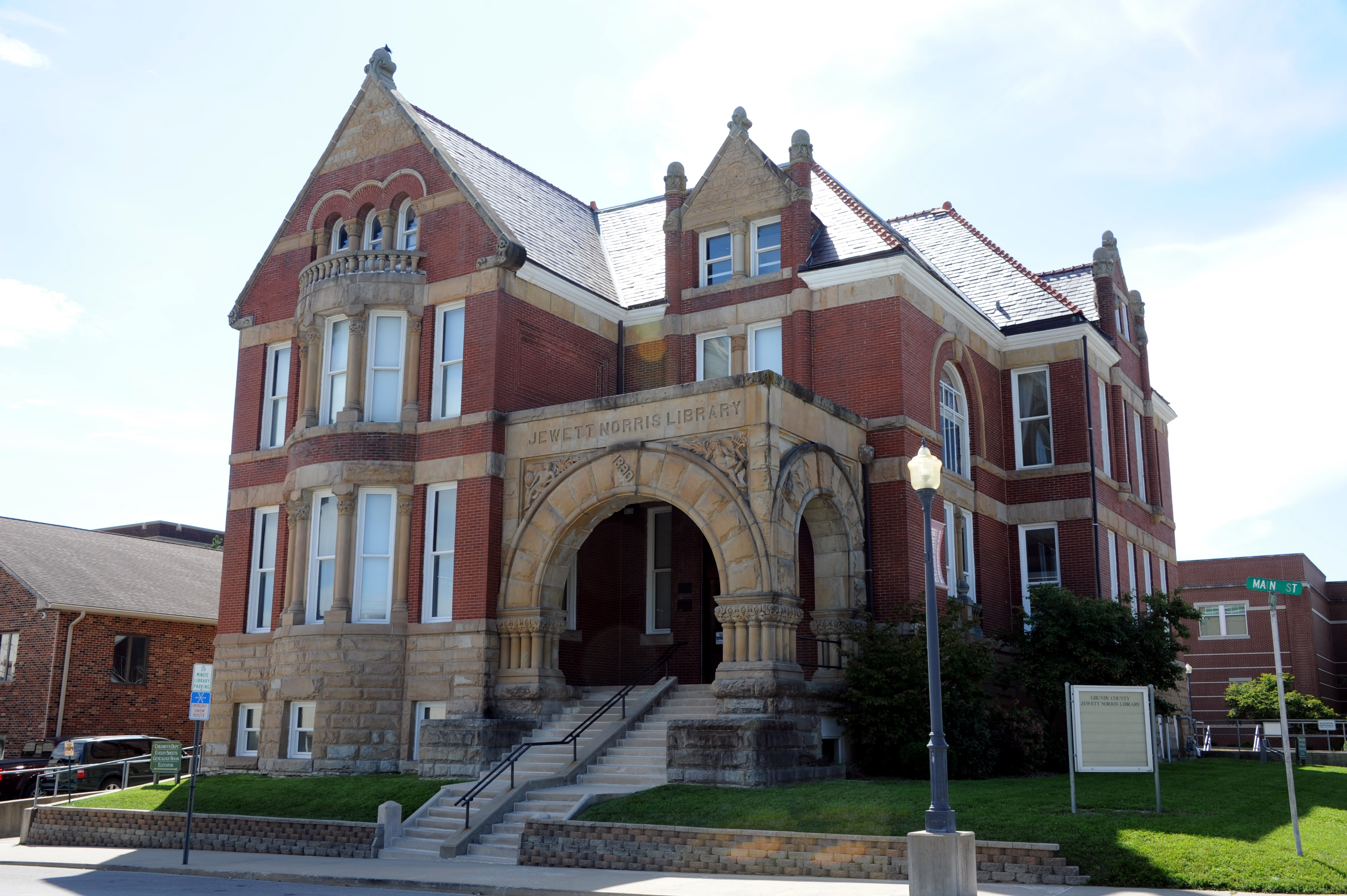

- Location within Missouri Location within the United States
- Location: 1331 Main St. Trenton, Missouri
- Coordinates: 40°4′43″N 93°36′22″W
- Area: less than one acre
- Built: 1891
- Architect: A.F. Gauger, Chauncey Hall
- Architectural style: Romanesque
- NRHP reference No.: 84002549
- Added to NRHP: September 7, 1984

Jewett Norris Library, also known as Grundy County Jewett Norris Library, is a historic library building located at Trenton, Grundy County, Missouri. It was built in 1891, and is a 2 1/2-story, Romanesque Revival style red brick and limestone building. It has a high stone base and broad stone steps leading to a porch with heavy, round stone arches.

It was listed on the National Register of Historic Places in 1984.
