= Roy Gardner (bank robber) =

American prison escapee

Roy G. Gardner (January 5, 1884 – January 10, 1940) was an American criminal active during the 1920s. He stole a total of more than $350,000 in cash and securities and several times escaped from custody. He is said to have been the most hunted man in Pacific Coast history, having had a $5,000 reward for his head three times in less than a year, and newspapers in the West referred to him as the "Smiling Bandit", the "Mail Train Bandit", and the "King of the Escape Artists" He is a former prisoner of Alcatraz Federal Penitentiary (1934–38).

== Early life ==
Roy Gardner was born on January 5, 1884, in Trenton, Missouri, and was raised in Colorado Springs, Colorado. He was said to be attractive and charming, standing just under six feet tall, with short, curly auburn hair and blue eyes. He spent his early manhood as a drifter in the Southwest, learning the trades of farrier and miner. Supposedly he joined the U.S. Army but deserted in 1906 and drifted to Mexico. He was married and had a daughter.

Gardner began his criminal profession as a gunrunner around the time of the Mexican Revolution. He smuggled and traded arms and ammunition to the Venustiano Carranza forces until he was captured by soldiers from Victoriao Huerta's army and was sentenced to death by firing squad; however, on March 29, 1909, he broke out of the Mexico City jail along with three other American prisoners after attacking the soldier guards. Back in the United States, Gardner became a prizefighter in the Southwest. He was good enough that he became a sparring partner for Heavyweight Champion J. J. Jeffries at Bennd Training Camp in Reno, Nevada, during the summer of 1910.

Eventually, Gardner ended up in San Francisco, where he gambled all of his boxing money away and then robbed a jewelry store on Market Street. He was arrested and spent some time in San Quentin, but was paroled after he saved a prison guard's life during a riot. He then landed a job as an acetylene welder at the Mare Island Navy Yard, married, fathered a daughter, and on Armistice Day in 1918 left and began his own welding company.

== Robbery career ==
On a business trip to Mexico, Gardner gambled all his money away at the racetracks in Tijuana. Then on the night of April 16, 1920, outside San Diego, he robbed a U. S. Mail truck of about $80,000 in cash and securities. The job went smoothly, but he was arrested three days later while burying his loot. He was sentenced to 25 years at McNeil Island Federal Penitentiary for the armed robbery, but vowed he would never serve the sentence. On June 5, 1920, he was being transported by train, accompanied by Deputy U. S. Marshals Cavanaugh and Haig. Some way outside Portland, Oregon, he peered out of the train window and yelled, "Look at that deer!". The lawmen looked, and Gardner grabbed Haig's gun from his holster, then disarmed Cavanaugh at gunpoint, handcuffed the two together, and stole $200. He jumped off the train and made his way to Canada.

He slipped back into the United States the next year, and started robbing banks and mail trains across the country as a lone bandit. Returning to California, on May 19, 1921, he tied up the mail clerk on Train No. 10 eastbound from Sacramento and robbed the express car of $187,000. The next morning, he told the mail clerk of Train No. 20 to throw up his hands or he would blow his head off. When the train reached the Overland Limited at Roseville, he ran down the tracks with an armful of mail. The home office recognized the gunman as Roy Gardner, the train robber with a $5,000 reward on his head.

Gardner was recognized at the Porter House Hotel and while he was playing a game of cards in a pool hall, federal agents arrived and captured him. He was sentenced to another 25 years at McNeil Island for armed robbery of the mail trains.

Trying to reduce his sentence, he told Southern Pacific Railroad detectives that he would lead them to the spot where he buried his loot. The officers found nothing, and Gardner announced, "I guess I have forgotten where I buried that money." He was heavily shackled, with the addition of an "Oregon Boot", and was once again transported on a train to McNeil Island, this time by U. S. Marshals Mulhall and Rinkell, both fast-shooting veterans. During the journey, Gardner asked to use the bathroom, in which an associate had earlier hidden a .32 caliber pistol. When he came out of the bathroom, Gardner pointed the gun at Mulhall and ordered another prisoner to handcuff the two lawmen to the seat. He relieved the officers of their weapons and cash before hopping onto another moving train outside Castle Rock, Washington.

The largest manhunt in Pacific Coast history began after this. Gardner was described as a dangerous man who would shoot on sight and must be captured at all costs. He once again had a $5,000 reward on his head.

He arrived in Centralia, Washington, where he was almost recognized by Jack Scuitto at the Oxford Hotel (present-day Olympic Club Hotel). Gardner plastered his face with bandages to hide his identity, leaving one eye slit, and told the hotel staff that he had been severely burned in an industrial accident near Tacoma. Proprietor Gertrude Howell and Officer Louis Sonney became suspicious of the bandaged man, and when Sonney saw a firearm in Gardner's hotel room, he accused him of being the "Smiling Bandit". Gardner fought back, but was arrested and a doctor removed the bandages, confirming his identity. He was sentenced to another 25 years, and heavily chained, was finally brought to McNeil Island.

=== Escape from McNeil Island ===
After six weeks at the penitentiary, Gardner had convinced two other prisoners, Lawardus Bogart and Everett Impyn, that he had "paid off" the guards in the towers. On Labor Day, September 5, 1921, at a prison baseball game, he said "Now!" during the fifth inning when someone hit a fly ball into center field, as the guards in the towers had their eyes on the ball and the runners. He, Bogart, and Impyn ran 300 yards to the high barbed-wire fence where Gardner cut a hole, and the three men ran to the pasture as bullets whirled about their heads. Gardner was wounded in his left leg, but escaped behind a herd of cattle near timber. He saw Bogart fall, badly wounded. Impyn was shot dead; his dying words were, "Gardner told us those fellows in the towers couldn't hit the broad side of a barn." Bogart later said that Gardner had deceived them and used his companions as decoys to better his chances of escape.

Guards scoured the beaches and confiscated every boat on the shoreline, but were unable to find Gardner, who lived in the prison barn, drinking milk from the cows, and then swam to Fox Island, where he lived off fruit in the orchards. Warden Maloney claimed Gardner was still on McNeil Island, but by that time Gardner had already left. A San Francisco newspaper published a letter from him.

=== Recapture and Alcatraz ===
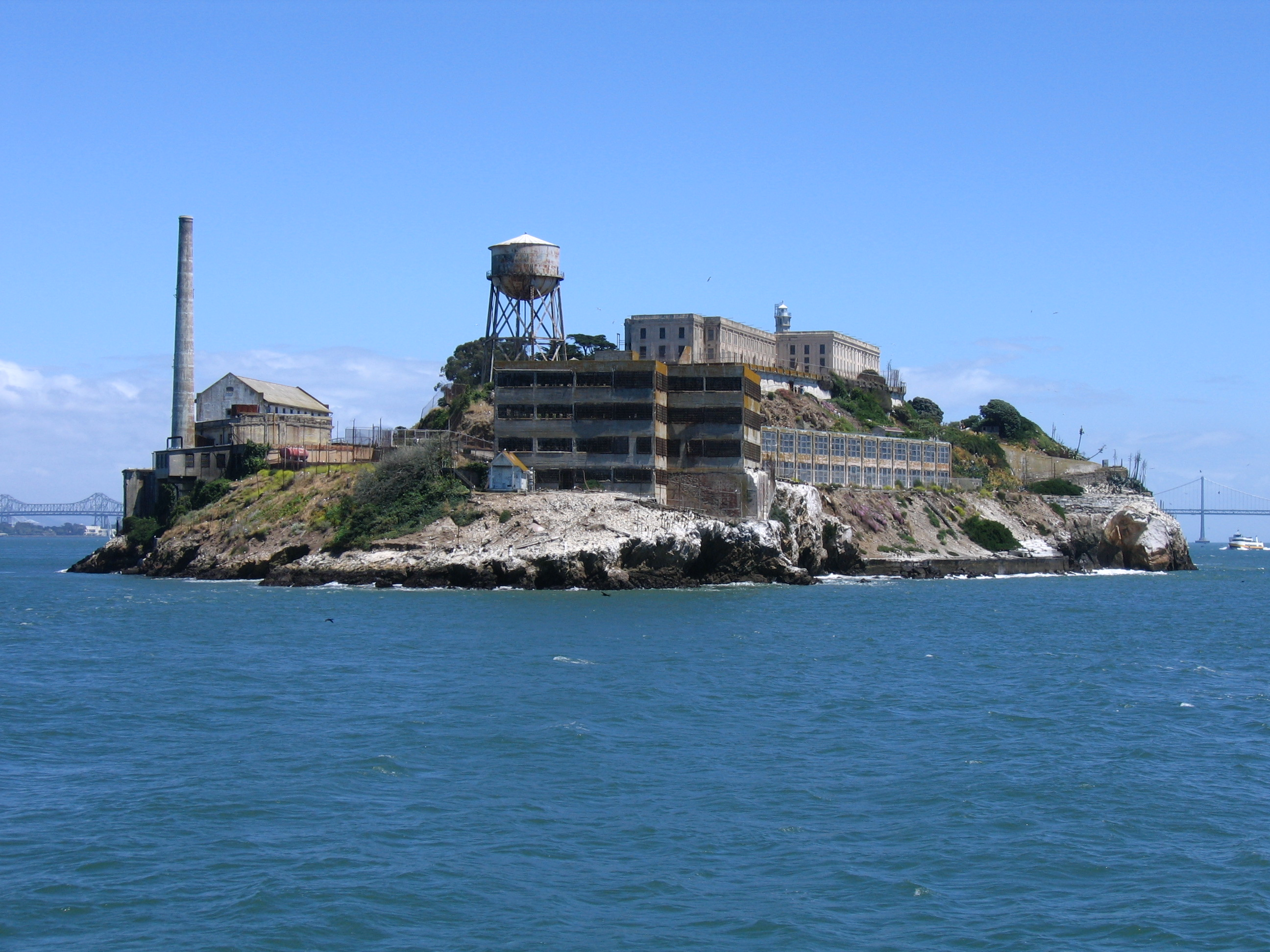
Alcatraz Island in 2005

Gardner was now the "Most Wanted" criminal, and committed several crimes in Arizona before he was captured by a mail clerk during a train robbery in Phoenix in fall 1921. He was sentenced to an additional 25 years, this time at Leavenworth Federal Penitentiary. Headlines read: "Gangster Gardner brags, 'Leavenworth will never hold me'".

Now known as the "King of the Escape Artists", Gardner was transferred in 1925 to Atlanta Federal Prison, then the toughest prison in the country. The following year, he tried to tunnel under the wall and saw through the bars in the shoe shop. Then in 1927, he led a prison break during which he held the captain and two guards hostage with two revolvers, but the escape failed and he was placed in solitary confinement for twenty months. When he was released from solitary confinement, he was placed in a mental hospital in Washington, D. C.

In 1929, the warden described Gardner as the "most dangerous inmate in the history of Atlanta Prison", and that year he began a hunger strike protesting prison food and threatened suicide. He was then transferred to Leavenworth Annex Prison in 1930, and in 1934 he was transferred to Alcatraz, where he was one of the first hardened criminals incarcerated there.

Gardner's time in Alcatraz coincided with Al Capone's. Capone was an unpopular prisoner. Supposedly, an unidentified inmate once threw a lead sash weight at Capone, but Capone was only wounded in the arm because Gardner pushed him out of the way.

During Gardner's time in Alcatraz, his wife divorced him. He worked and supervised at the mat shop with Ralph Roe and they planned an escape, but Gardner was paroled and released in 1938 after his appeal for clemency was approved.

== Final years ==
In 1939 Gardner published his autobiography, titled Hellcatraz. He attended crime lectures, and he and Louis Sonney made one of the first re-enactments, a short film called You Can't Beat the Rap. Gardner worked as a film salesman and an exposition barker. A 1939 movie called I Stole a Million was based on his life; it was a failure. After being paroled he became a guide on a tour boat that circled Alcatraz Island. On the evening of January 10, 1940, in a hotel room in San Francisco (Aumont), Gardner wrote four notes; one of them he attached to the door, warning: "Do not open door. Poison gas. Call police." He sealed the door from the inside, then killed himself by dropping cyanide into a glass of acid and inhaling the poison fumes.
