= Dunlap, Missouri =

Unincorporated community in Missouri, U.S.

Coordinates: 40°06′30″N 93°28′57″W

Dunlap is an unincorporated community in Grundy County, in the U.S. state of Missouri.

== History ==
Variant names were "Banta", "Corneau", and "Dillon". A post office called Banta was established in 1881, the name was changed to Corneau in 1882, renamed again Dunlap in 1888, and the post office closed in 1942. The community most likely was named after William Dunlap, an early settler. Despite Dunlap being listed as an incorporated village in the Missouri Blue Book published by the Missouri Secretary of State, Martinsville does not seem to be incorporated anymore according to a 2026 MoDOT map of Grundy County and the Grundy County website.

== Demographics ==
Historical population
Census	Pop.	Note	%±
1960	50		—
1970	47		−6.0%
Missouri Census Data Center
