= Trenton High School (Trenton, Missouri) =

- U.S. National Register of Historic Places
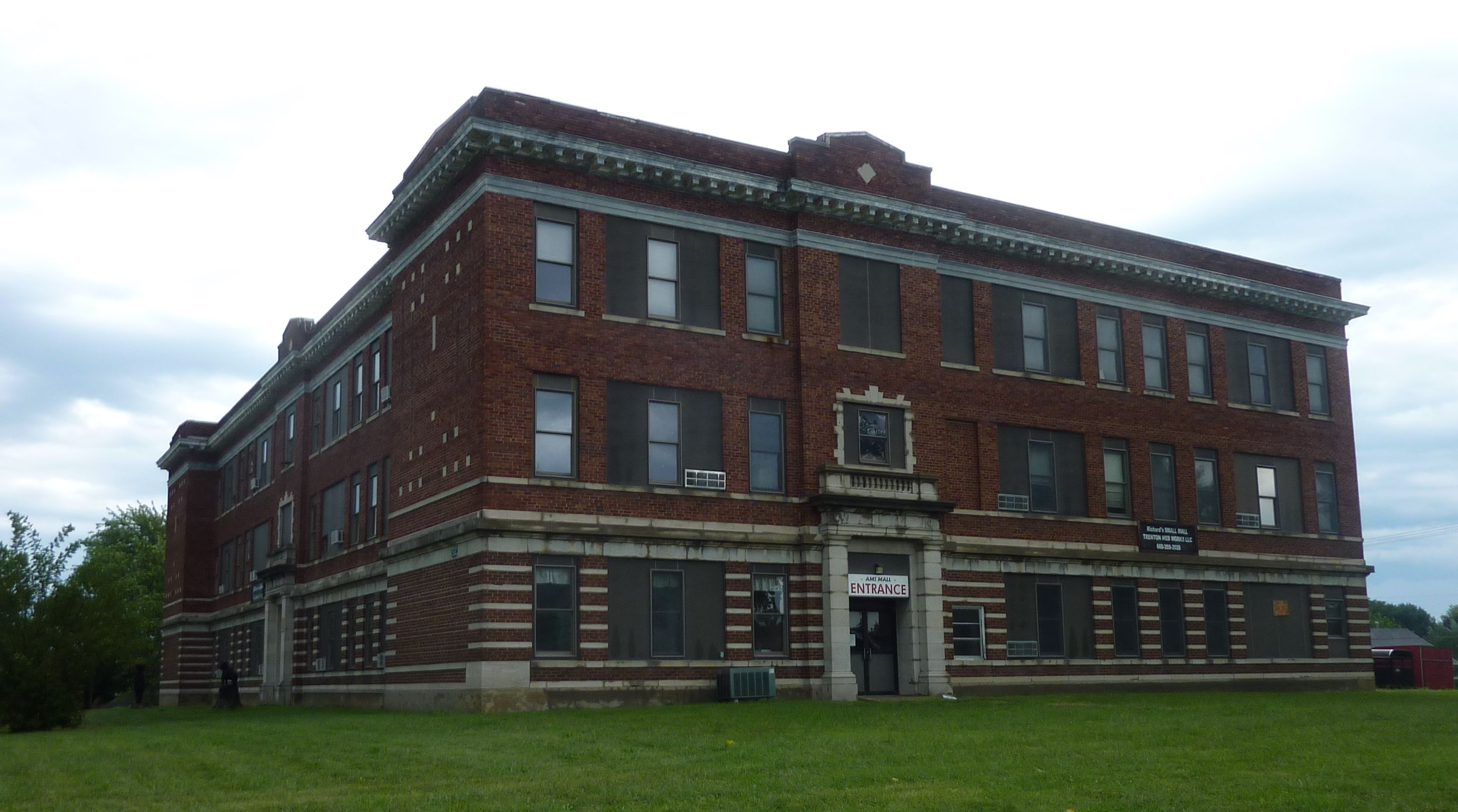
- Trenton High School, August 2010

- Location within Missouri Location within the United States
- Location: 1312 E. 9th St., Trenton, Missouri
- Coordinates: 40°4′27″N 93°36′18″W
- Area: less than one acre
- Built: 1924
- Built by: Ebbe, C.C.
- Architect: Sanneman, Raymond H.
- Architectural style: Classical Revival
- NRHP reference No.: 10000203
- Added to NRHP: April 21, 2010

Trenton High School, also known as Trenton Junior College and Adams Middle School, is a historic school building located at Trenton, Grundy County, Missouri. It was built in 1924, and is a three-story, rectangular, Classical Revival style reinforced concrete building with brick walls. It has a concrete foundation and flat roof with shaped parapets with cast stone coping. It features decorative cast stone trim. The school closed in 2005.

It was listed on the National Register of Historic Places in 2010.
