= Mill Grove, Missouri =

Unincorporated community in Missouri, U.S.

Coordinates: 40°18′33″N 93°35′37″W

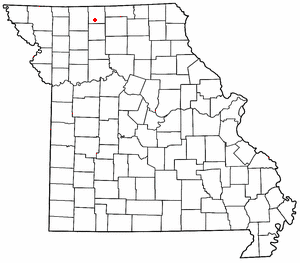

Mill Grove is an unincorporated community in Mercer County, Missouri, United States. It is located approximately one mile west of U.S. Route 65 on Missouri Supplemental Route D or six miles south of Princeton. The Weldon River flows past the west side of the community.

Mill Grove was platted in 1870, and named for a mill near the original town site. A post office called Mill Grove was established in 1873, and remained in operation until 1974.
