= Trenton station (disambiguation) =

Trenton station could refer to:

- Trenton Transit Center, a train station in Trenton, New Jersey
- West Trenton station, another train station in Trenton, New Jersey
- Trenton station (Atlantic Coast Line Railroad), a disused train station in Trenton, Florida
- Trenton station (Reading Railroad), a disused train station in Trenton, New Jersey
