= Blackjack Hill =

Missouri geographic feature

- Location within Missouri

Highest point
- Elevation: 1,221 ft (372 m)
- Coordinates: 37°53′30.93″N 90°45′15.14″W

Geography
- Location: Washington County, Missouri, US
- Parent range: Ozarks

Blackjack Hill is a summit in Washington County in the U.S. state of Missouri. The peak has an elevation of 1,221 feet (372 m).

Blackjack Hill was named for the blackjack oak in the area.
