= Thompson River (Missouri) =

River in Iowa and Missouri, U.S.

Thompson River Thompson Fork Grand River

Location
- Country: United States
- State: Iowa, Missouri

Physical characteristics
- Source: Near Greenfield
  - location: Adair County, Iowa
  - coordinates: 41°21′24″N 94°25′52″W
  - elevation: 1,360 ft (410 m)
- Mouth: Grand River
  - location: Livingston County, Missouri
  - coordinates: 39°45′50″N 93°36′52″W
  - elevation: 679 ft (207 m)
- Length: 188 mi (303 km)
- Basin size: 1,850 mi^{2} (4,800 km^{2})
- Discharge
  - location: Trenton, 25.2 miles (40.6 km) from the mouth
  - average: 1,059 cu ft/s (30.0 m^{3}/s)
  - minimum: 1 cu ft/s (0.028 m^{3}/s)
  - maximum: 95,000 cu ft/s (2,700 m^{3}/s)

Basin features
- Tributaries
  - left: Peteet Creek, Weldon River, Honey Creek
  - right: Sugar Creek, Hickory Creek

The Thompson River is the largest tributary of the Grand River in the central United States, flowing from southern Iowa into Missouri. In Iowa, it is known simply as the Grand River and passes near the city of Grand River. The river is 188 miles (303 km) long, and its drainage basin is roughly 1,850 square miles (4,800 km^{2}), of which 1,111 square miles (2,880 km^{2}) are in Missouri.

It rises in the agricultural lands of Adair County, Iowa, a few miles northeast of Greenfield. The river initially flows east then bends south, passing Macksburg and Davis City and crossing Interstate 35. It then flows into Missouri, where much of its course is channelized. The Weldon River joins at the town of Trenton, the largest settlement along the Thompson River. Below Trenton, the Thompson meanders south for another 25 miles (40 km), joining the Grand River just north of Utica in Livingston County.

== See also ==
- List of rivers of Iowa
- List of rivers of Missouri
