= Trenton, Wisconsin =

Trenton is the name of some places in the U.S. state of Wisconsin:

- Trenton, Dodge County, Wisconsin, a town
- Trenton, Pierce County, Wisconsin, a town
- Trenton (community), Wisconsin, an unincorporated community
- Trenton, Washington County, Wisconsin, a town
