= USS Trenton =

Four ships of the United States Navy have been named USS Trenton, after the city of Trenton, New Jersey, site of the Battle of Trenton in the American Revolutionary War.

- USS Trenton (1876) was a wooden screw steamer commissioned in 1877 and wrecked at Samoa by a hurricane in 1889.
- USS Trenton (CL-11) was a light cruiser initially in service in 1924, seeing some action during World War II, and decommissioned in 1945.
- USS Trenton (LPD-14) was an amphibious transport dock commissioned in 1971. It was sold to the Indian Navy in 2007 and renamed INS Jalashwa, meaning "river/sea horse".
- USNS Trenton (T-EPF-5) is a Spearhead-class expeditionary fast transport.
