= Trenton Airport =

Trenton Airport may refer to:

- Trenton–Mercer Airport, northwest of Trenton, New Jersey, United States (FAA: TTN)
- Trenton Municipal Airport (Missouri) in Trenton, Missouri, United States (FAA: TRX)
- Trenton Municipal Airport (Nebraska) in Trenton, Nebraska, United States (FAA: 9V2)
- Trenton–Robbinsville Airport, in Robbinsville, New Jersey, United States (FAA: N87)
- Trenton Aerodrome, in Trenton, Nova Scotia, Canada (ICAO: CYTN)
- CFB Trenton, a Canadian Forces Base northeast of Trenton, Ontario, Canada (ICAO: CYTR)
