= Crowder State Park =

State park in Missouri, United States

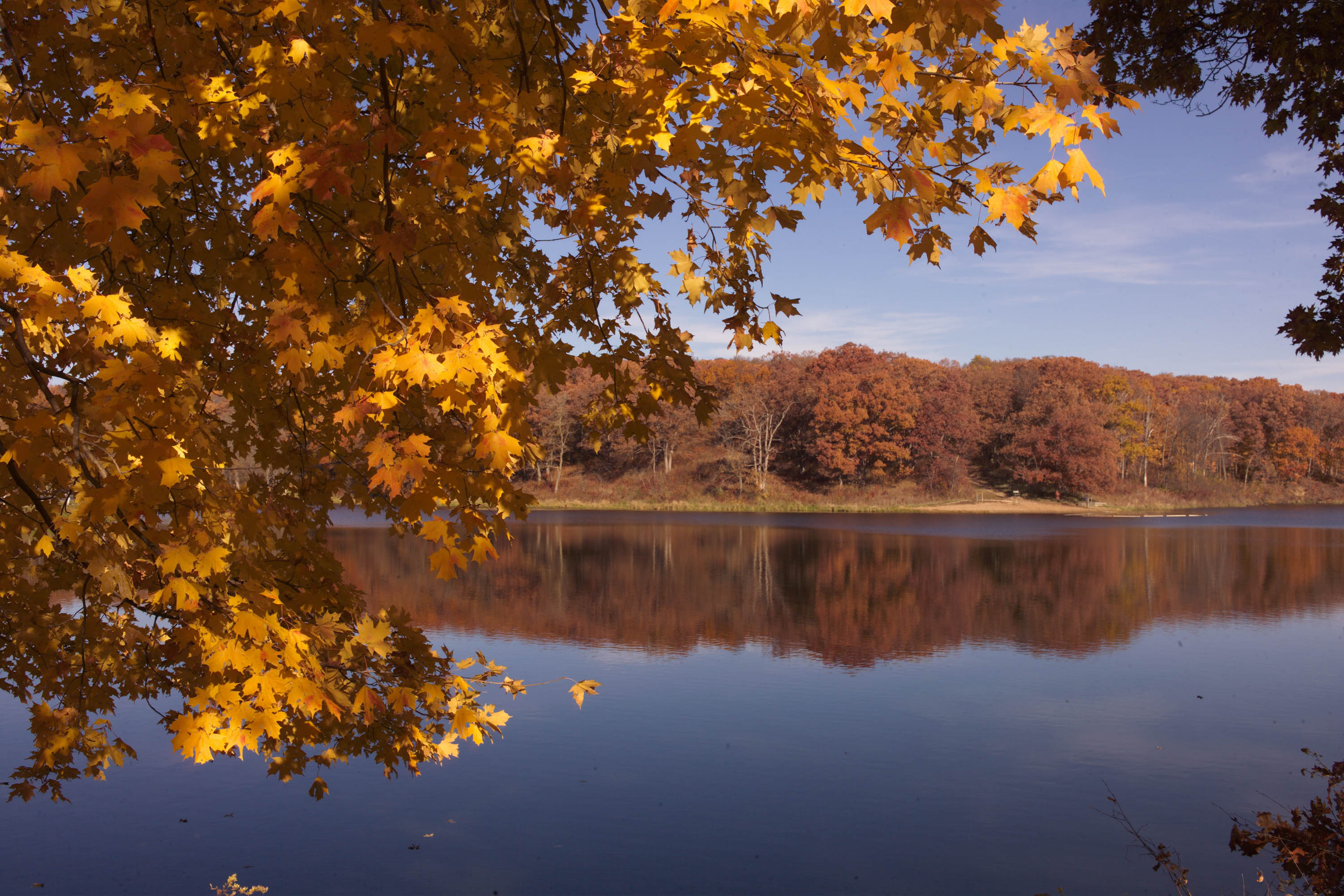
- Crowder Lake

- Location within Missouri Location within the United States
- Location: Grundy County, Missouri, United States
- Coordinates: 40°05′41″N 93°39′43″W
- Area: 1,912.06 acres (773.78 ha)
- Elevation: 764 ft (233 m)
- Established: 1938
- Administrator: Missouri Department of Natural Resources
- Visitors: 79,877 (in 2022)
- Website: Official website
- Crowder State Park Vehicle Bridge
- U.S. National Register of Historic Places
- Nearest city: Trenton, Missouri
- Area: Less than one acre
- Built: c. 1939
- Built by: Civilian Conservation Corps
- Architectural style: Rustic arch
- MPS: ECW Architecture in Missouri State Parks 1933-1942 TR
- NRHP reference No.: 85000505
- Added to NRHP: March 4, 1985

Crowder State Park is a public recreation area of 1,912 acres (774 ha) surrounding 18-acre (7.3 ha) Crowder Lake near Trenton in Grundy County, Missouri, USA. The state park and lake are named after Maj. General Enoch H. Crowder, who was born and raised near the park.

== Features ==
The Crowder State Park Vehicle Bridge, a small single-arch span of reinforced concrete with a facing of cut stone built about 1939, is the only surviving structure erected in the park by the Civilian Conservation Corps. It was listed on the National Register of Historic Places in 1985.

== Activities and amenities ==
The park offers picnicking, camping, fishing, swimming, canoeing, and trails for hiking, cycling and horseback riding.
