= Trenton, Missouri =

City in Missouri, U.S.

- City
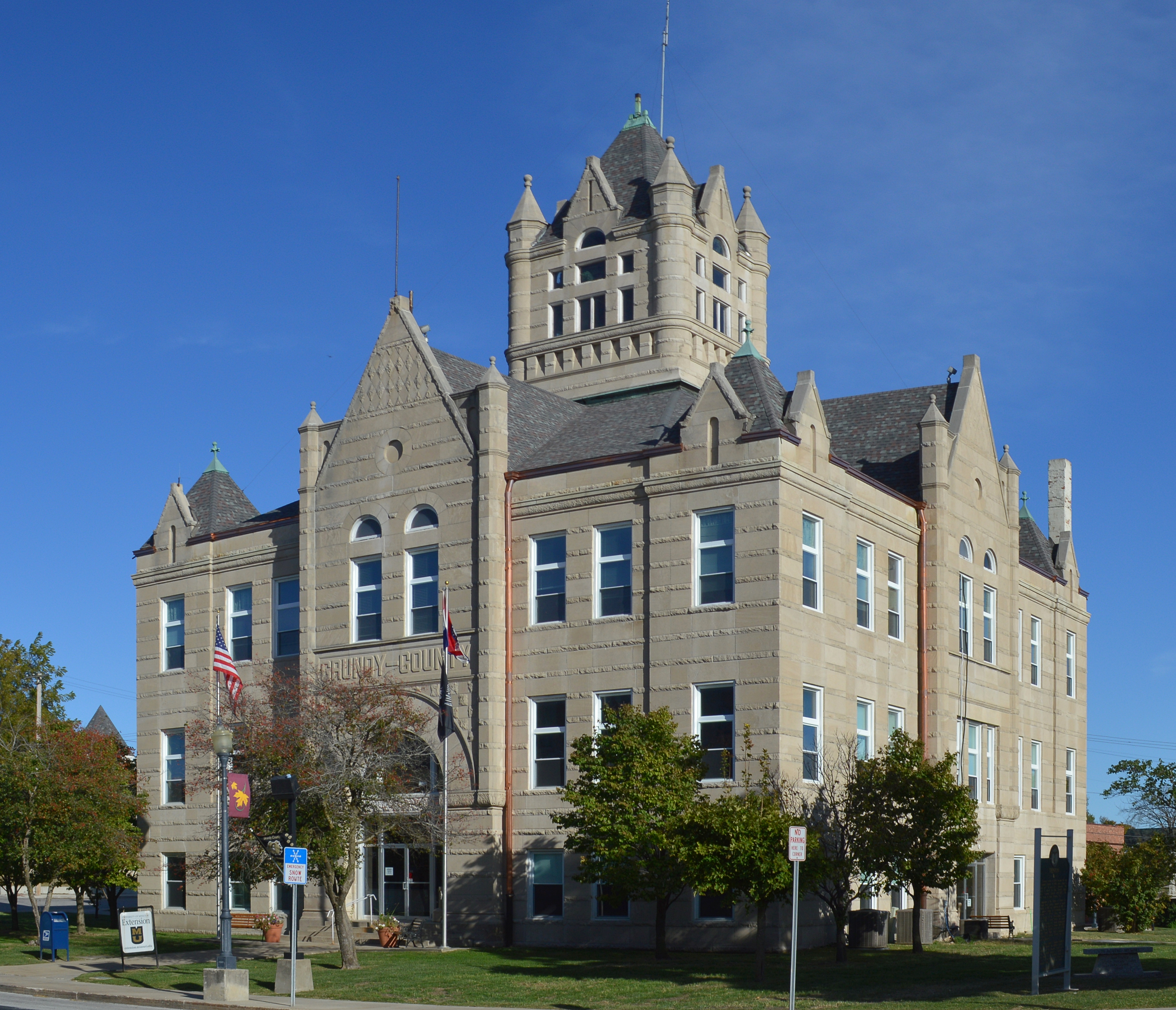
- Grundy county Missouri courthouse
- Nickname(s): City of friendly citizens, The Five Point City
- Location of Trenton, Missouri

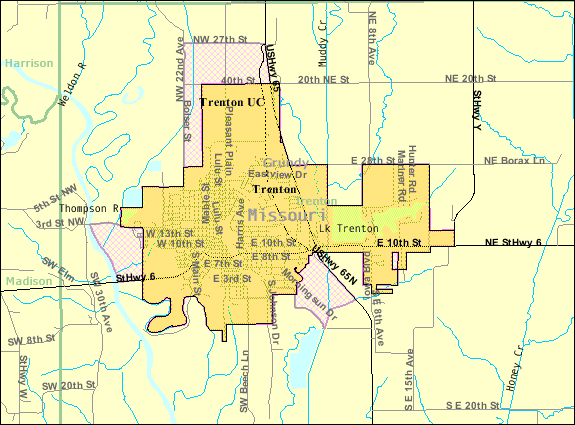
- U.S. Census Map
- Coordinates: 40°4′44″N 93°37′00″W
- Country: United States
- State: Missouri
- County: Grundy
- Incorporated: 1857

Government
  - Mayor: Jackie Soptic

Area
  - Total: 6.73 sq mi (17.44 km^{2})
  - Land: 6.45 sq mi (16.70 km^{2})
  - Water: 0.29 sq mi (0.75 km^{2})
- Elevation: 768 ft (234 m)

Population (2020)
  - Total: 5,609
  - Estimate (2024): 5,588
  - Density: 870/sq mi (335.9/km^{2})
- Time zone: UTC-6 (Central (CST))
  - Summer (DST): UTC-5 (CDT)
- ZIP code: 64683
- Area code: 660
- FIPS code: 29-73816
- GNIS feature ID: 2397050
- Website: City of Trenton

Trenton is a city in and the county seat of Grundy County, Missouri, United States. The population was 5,609 at the 2020 United States census. It is the county seat of Grundy County. The city was the world's largest producer of vienna sausages at its biggest employer, the ConAgra Grocery Foods plant, then bought by Nestlé.

== History ==
The Crowder State Park Vehicle Bridge, Jewett Norris Library, Plaza Hotel, St. Philip's Episcopal Church, Trenton High School, and WPA Stock Barn and Pavilion are listed on the National Register of Historic Places.

=== The Utopian Socialist Ruskin College Movement ===
In 1869, the Chicago, Rock Island and Pacific Railroad arrived in Trenton. In 1890, Avalon College, which had been founded in Avalon, Missouri by the United Brethren in 1869, moved to Trenton because of proximity to the railroad.

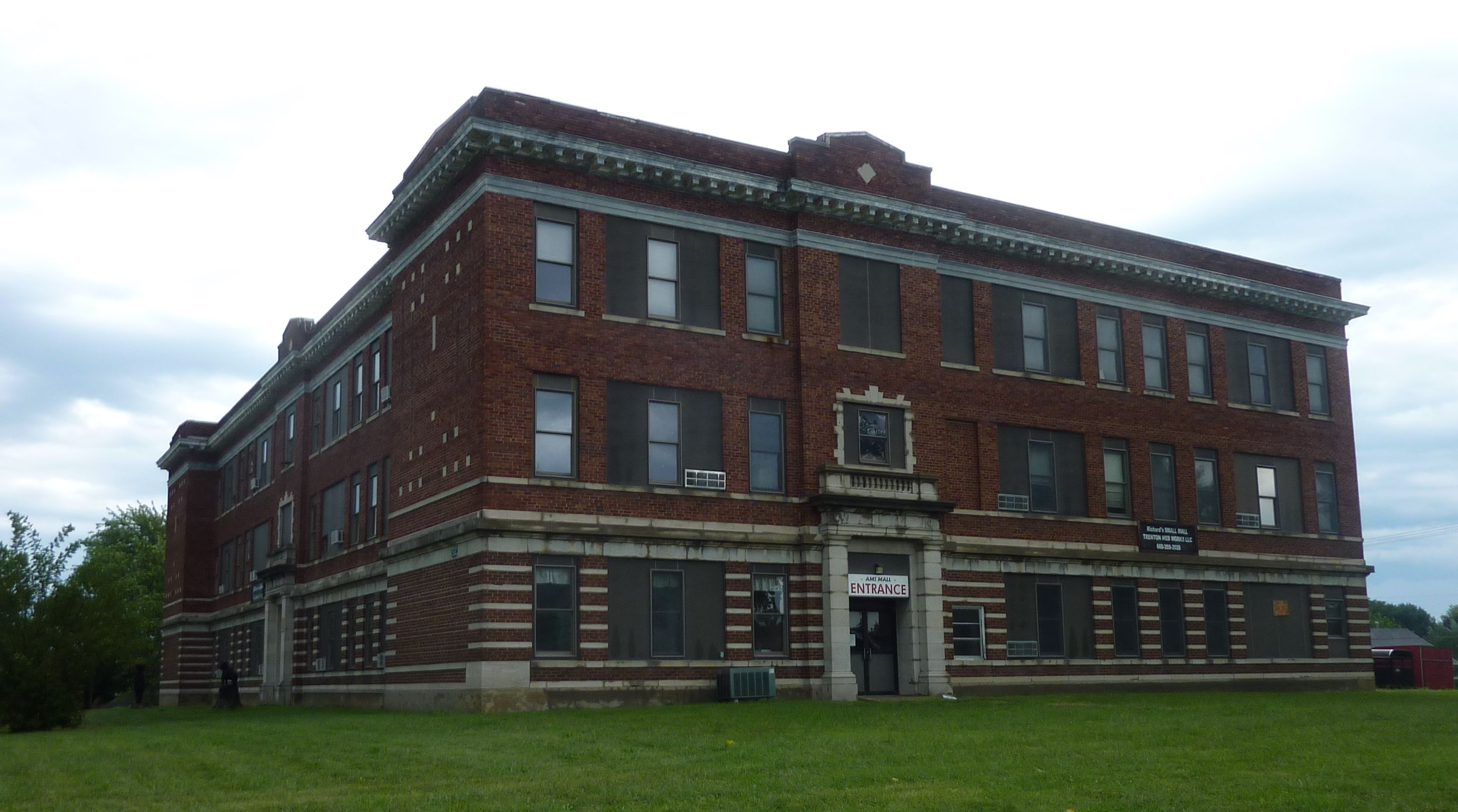
Former site of Trenton High School which is on the site of Ruskin College. The building is on the National Register of Historic Places.

Due to financial difficulties, the college nearly closed again. In 1900 George McAnelly Miller started to turn the school around. He was soon joined by Walter Vrooman who had just returned from Oxford, England where he established Ruskin Hall, a university called the "College for the People" based on the Utopian Socialist writings of John Ruskin. Avalon College was renamed Ruskin College after Vrooman donated 1,500 acres (6.1 km^{2}) to it.

The college directly loaned money to the students and they could work at the school's canning, farming, and novelty wood working businesses. The college admitted women, unlike the Oxford school.

Vrooman then proceeded to attempt to buy the major businesses in the town, starting with three grocery stores, a hardware store, and a drug store. He paid in cash via the Western Cooperative Association. The New York Times on April 14, 1902, headlined its article "Buying a Town Outright". According to the cooperative arrangement, members of the coop who spent at least $300 (equivalent to $11,000 in 2025) in one of its stores would receive a dividend at the end of the year.

The Ruskin experiment collapsed in 1903 when town residents resisted the Utopian business model and Vrooman's wife divorced him saying that he had squandered $250,000 (equivalent to $9,000,000 in 2025) of her money. Miller moved the college to the Chicago suburb of Glen Ellyn, Illinois in 1903 where it consolidated 12 different colleges and had an enrollment of 2,500 with 8,000 correspondence students. Friction quickly arose there also and the main school burned after being struck by lightning.

Miller moved the college again in 1906 to Ruskin, Florida where 550 acres (2.2 km^{2}) of land around Trenton was swapped for 12,000 acres (49 km^{2}). Many of the Florida campus buildings burned in 1918 and when Miller died in 1919, the college ceased to exist.

In 1925, Trenton Junior College was established (which is now North Central Missouri College). Through expansion projects and support from numerous people, North Central Missouri College (NCMC) has developed into a major agricultural and nursing educational institution for the state of Missouri. Construction additions have since added to the size of the main campus. Plus directly south of Trenton, a project completed in 2011 established a satellite agricultural location known as the Barton Farm Campus. It contains three classroom buildings, a wind turbine, two acre pond and numerous test plots all on 138 acres of farm ground given to NCMC by the Barton family.

== Superfund sites ==
Trenton has two hazardous waste dump sites. One is on the property of Modine Manufacturing, a plant that makes automobile radiators. Modine has produced a variety of acid, lead, and copper-bearing waste products which in previous decades were buried on site and also at a public dump a mile north east of the plant.

== Geography ==
The city is on the Thompson River floodplain between the Thompson River on the west and its Muddy Creek tributary on the east. U.S. Route 65 passes the east side of the city and Missouri Route 6 passes through the south side. Chillicothe is nineteen miles to the south.

According to the United States Census Bureau, the city has a total area of 6.74 square miles (17.46 km^{2}), of which 6.45 square miles (16.71 km^{2}) is land and 0.29 square miles (0.75 km^{2}) is water.

=== Climate ===
Climate data for Trenton, Missouri (1991–2020 normals, extremes 1895–present)
Month	Jan	Feb	Mar	Apr	May	Jun	Jul	Aug	Sep	Oct	Nov	Dec	Year
Record high °F (°C)	69 (21)	82 (28)	88 (31)	94 (34)	105 (41)	107 (42)	114 (46)	113 (45)	106 (41)	98 (37)	84 (29)	72 (22)	114 (46)
Mean daily maximum °F (°C)	34.8 (1.6)	40.3 (4.6)	52.5 (11.4)	63.9 (17.7)	74.6 (23.7)	84.5 (29.2)	88.9 (31.6)	86.9 (30.5)	79.4 (26.3)	66.7 (19.3)	51.7 (10.9)	39.5 (4.2)	63.6 (17.6)
Daily mean °F (°C)	25.5 (−3.6)	30.0 (−1.1)	41.2 (5.1)	52.3 (11.3)	63.6 (17.6)	73.6 (23.1)	77.8 (25.4)	75.5 (24.2)	67.1 (19.5)	54.7 (12.6)	41.3 (5.2)	30.4 (−0.9)	52.8 (11.6)
Mean daily minimum °F (°C)	16.3 (−8.7)	19.8 (−6.8)	29.9 (−1.2)	40.6 (4.8)	52.7 (11.5)	62.7 (17.1)	66.8 (19.3)	64.1 (17.8)	54.8 (12.7)	42.6 (5.9)	31.0 (−0.6)	21.4 (−5.9)	41.9 (5.5)
Record low °F (°C)	−26 (−32)	−25 (−32)	−15 (−26)	9 (−13)	22 (−6)	42 (6)	46 (8)	42 (6)	27 (−3)	3 (−16)	−6 (−21)	−24 (−31)	−26 (−32)
Average precipitation inches (mm)	1.13 (29)	1.70 (43)	2.60 (66)	3.90 (99)	6.02 (153)	4.76 (121)	4.77 (121)	4.27 (108)	3.88 (99)	3.08 (78)	2.22 (56)	1.74 (44)	40.07 (1,018)
Average snowfall inches (cm)	4.7 (12)	4.7 (12)	2.9 (7.4)	0.3 (0.76)	0.0 (0.0)	0.0 (0.0)	0.0 (0.0)	0.0 (0.0)	0.0 (0.0)	0.2 (0.51)	0.9 (2.3)	3.5 (8.9)	17.2 (44)
Average precipitation days (≥ 0.01 in)	5.6	7.1	8.9	10.6	12.3	10.1	8.2	9.0	7.2	8.3	6.1	6.4	99.8
Average snowy days (≥ 0.1 in)	2.7	2.7	1.1	0.2	0.0	0.0	0.0	0.0	0.0	0.2	0.7	3.1	10.7
Source: NOAA

== Demographics ==
Historical population
Census	Pop.	Note	%±
1860	617		—
1870	920		49.1%
1880	3,312		260.0%
1890	5,039		52.1%
1900	5,396		7.1%
1910	5,656		4.8%
1920	6,951		22.9%
1930	6,992		0.6%
1940	7,046		0.8%
1950	6,157		−12.6%
1960	6,262		1.7%
1970	6,063		−3.2%
1980	6,811		12.3%
1990	6,129		−10.0%
2000	6,216		1.4%
2010	6,001		−3.5%
2020	5,609		−6.5%
U.S. Decennial Census

=== 2020 census ===
As of the 2020 census, Trenton had a population of 5,609. The median age was 41.1 years. 23.2% of residents were under the age of 18 and 23.2% of residents were 65 years of age or older. For every 100 females there were 90.4 males, and for every 100 females age 18 and over there were 86.3 males age 18 and over.

96.7% of residents lived in urban areas, while 3.3% lived in rural areas.

There were 2,408 households in Trenton, of which 26.9% had children under the age of 18 living in them. Of all households, 38.6% were married-couple households, 20.0% were households with a male householder and no spouse or partner present, and 33.6% were households with a female householder and no spouse or partner present. About 38.1% of all households were made up of individuals and 19.3% had someone living alone who was 65 years of age or older.

There were 2,946 housing units, of which 18.3% were vacant. The homeowner vacancy rate was 3.9% and the rental vacancy rate was 16.3%.

Racial composition as of the 2020 census
Race	Number	Percent
White	5,192	92.6%
Black or African American	49	0.9%
American Indian and Alaska Native	21	0.4%
Asian	44	0.8%
Native Hawaiian and Other Pacific Islander	7	0.1%
Some other race	67	1.2%
Two or more races	229	4.1%
Hispanic or Latino (of any race)	181	3.2%

=== 2010 census ===
As of the census of 2010, there were 6,001 people, 2,559 households, and 1,467 families residing in the city. The population density was 930.4 inhabitants per square mile (359.2/km^{2}). There were 2,960 housing units at an average density of 458.9 per square mile (177.2/km^{2}). The racial makeup of the city was 96.0% White, 0.8% African American, 0.5% Native American, 0.5% Asian, 0.9% from other races, and 1.1% from two or more races. Hispanic or Latino of any race were 2.4% of the population.

There were 2,559 households, of which 26.5% had children under the age of 18 living with them, 43.0% were married couples living together, 9.9% had a female householder with no husband present, 4.4% had a male householder with no wife present, and 42.7% were non-families. 37.9% of all households were made up of individuals, and 19.5% had someone living alone who was 65 years of age or older. The average household size was 2.21 and the average family size was 2.89.

The median age in the city was 41.6 years. 22.6% of residents were under the age of 18; 10.2% were between the ages of 18 and 24; 20.7% were from 25 to 44; 23.6% were from 45 to 64; and 22.8% were 65 years of age or older. The gender makeup of the city was 45.7% male and 54.3% female.

=== 2000 census ===
As of the census of 2000, there were 6,216 people, 2,673 households, and 1,641 families residing in the city. The population density was 1,065.5 inhabitants per square mile (411.4/km^{2}). There were 3,059 housing units at an average density of 524.3 per square mile (202.4/km^{2}). The racial makeup of the city was 97.20% White, 0.56% African American, 0.40% Native American, 0.21% Asian, 0.02% Pacific Islander, 0.74% from other races, and 0.87% from two or more races. Hispanic or Latino of any race were 2.14% of the population.

There were 2,673 households, out of which 25.6% had children under the age of 18 living with them, 49.0% were married couples living together, 9.4% had a female householder with no husband present, and 38.6% were non-families. 35.2% of all households were made up of individuals, and 19.6% had someone living alone who was 65 years of age or older. The average household size was 2.19 and the average family size was 2.81.

In the city the population was spread out, with 22.0% under the age of 18, 9.1% from 18 to 24, 23.0% from 25 to 44, 22.2% from 45 to 64, and 23.7% who were 65 years of age or older. The median age was 42 years. For every 100 females, there were 83.7 males. For every 100 females age 18 and over, there were 80.4 males.

The median income for a household in the city was $25,733, and the median income for a family was $33,317. Males had a median income of $26,959 versus $16,505 for females. The per capita income for the city was $15,834. About 12.7% of families and 17.1% of the population were below the poverty line, including 23.2% of those under age 18 and 14.6% of those age 65 or over.

== Education ==
Public education in Trenton is administered by Trenton R-IX School District.

Trenton has a public library, the Grundy County-Jewett Norris Library.

== Notable people ==
- Roy Gardner, 1920s bank robber
- John Hack, war hero
- Yank Lawson, Dixieland trumpet player
- Imogene Lynn, pop singer
- Gregg Miller, inventor and author
- J. M. Whorton, politician

== See also ==
- List of cities in Missouri
- Grundy county Missouri courthouse
