= Grundy County, Missouri =

County in Missouri, United States

- County
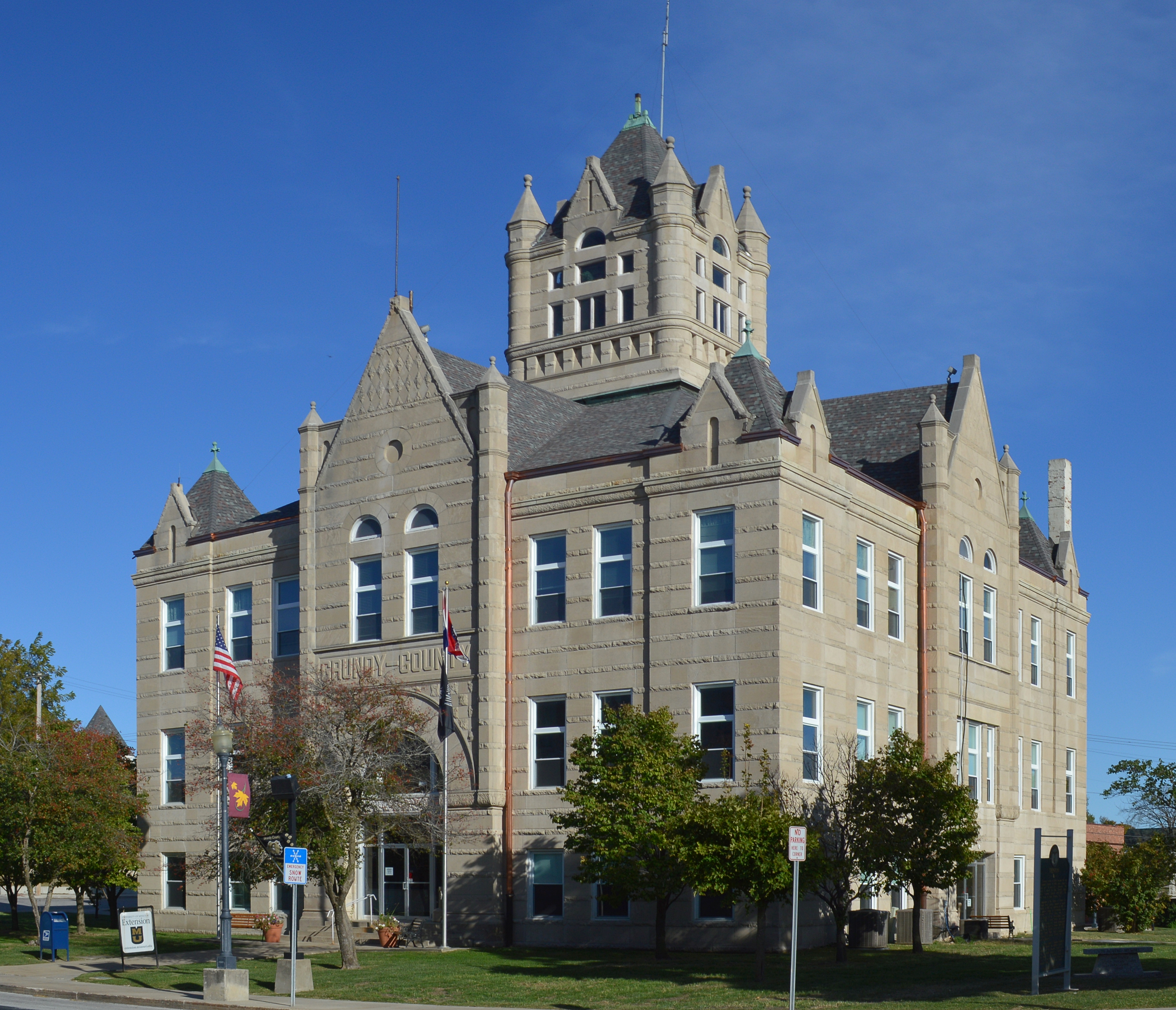
- Grundy County Courthouse in Trenton

- Location within the U.S. state of Missouri
- Coordinates: 40°07′N 93°34′W
- Country: United States
- State: Missouri
- Founded: January 2, 1841
- Named for: Felix Grundy
- Seat: Trenton
- Largest city: Trenton

Area
  - Total: 438 sq mi (1,130 km^{2})
  - Land: 435 sq mi (1,130 km^{2})
  - Water: 2.8 sq mi (7.3 km^{2}) 0.6%

Population (2020)
  - Total: 9,808
  - Estimate (2025): 9,744 ▼
  - Density: 22.4/sq mi (8.6/km^{2})
- Time zone: UTC−6 (Central)
  - Summer (DST): UTC−5 (CDT)
- Congressional district: 6th
- Website: www.grundycountymo.com

Grundy County is a county located in the U.S. state of Missouri. As of the 2020 census, the population was 9,808. Its county seat is Trenton. The county was organized January 2, 1841, from part of Livingston County, Missouri and named after U.S. Attorney General Felix Grundy.

== Geography ==
According to the U.S. Census Bureau, the county has a total area of 438 square miles (1,130 km^{2}), of which 435 square miles (1,130 km^{2}) is land and 2.8 square miles (7.3 km^{2}) (0.6%) is water.

=== Adjacent counties ===
- Mercer County (north)
- Sullivan County (east)
- Linn County (southeast)
- Livingston County (south)
- Daviess County (southwest)
- Harrison County (northwest)

=== Major highways ===
- U.S. Route 65
- Route 6
- Route 128
- Route 139
- Route 146
- Route 190

== Demographics ==
Historical population
Census	Pop.	Note	%±
1850	3,006		—
1860	7,887		162.4%
1870	10,567		34.0%
1880	15,185		43.7%
1890	17,876		17.7%
1900	17,832		−0.2%
1910	16,744		−6.1%
1920	17,554		4.8%
1930	16,135		−8.1%
1940	15,716		−2.6%
1950	13,220		−15.9%
1960	12,220		−7.6%
1970	11,819		−3.3%
1980	11,959		1.2%
1990	10,536		−11.9%
2000	10,432		−1.0%
2010	10,261		−1.6%
2020	9,808		−4.4%
2025 (est.)	9,744	▼	−0.7%

=== 2020 census ===
As of the 2020 census, the county had a population of 9,808, a median age of 40.4 years, 25.0% of residents under the age of 18, and 22.3% aged 65 or older; there were 96.4 males for every 100 females and 93.4 males for every 100 females age 18 and over.

The racial makeup of the county in 2020 was 94.1% White, 0.6% Black or African American, 0.4% American Indian and Alaska Native, 0.6% Asian, 0.1% Native Hawaiian and Pacific Islander, 0.9% from some other race, and 3.5% from two or more races, while Hispanic or Latino residents of any race comprised 2.5% of the population.

There were 3,996 households in the county, of which 28.8% had children under the age of 18 living with them, 26.2% had a female householder with no spouse or partner present, 32.4% were made up of individuals, and 16.4% had someone living alone who was 65 years of age or older.

There were 4,844 housing units, 17.5% of which were vacant; of the occupied units, 70.9% were owner-occupied and 29.1% were renter-occupied, with homeowner and rental vacancy rates of 3.3% and 14.5%, respectively.

55.3% of residents lived in urban areas while 44.7% lived in rural areas.

=== Racial and ethnic composition ===
Grundy County, Missouri – Racial and ethnic composition Note: the US Census treats Hispanic/Latino as an ethnic category. This table excludes Latinos from the racial categories and assigns them to a separate category. Hispanics/Latinos may be of any race.
Race / Ethnicity (NH = Non-Hispanic)	Pop 1980	Pop 1990	Pop 2000	Pop 2010	Pop 2020	% 1980	% 1990	% 2000	% 2010	% 2020
White alone (NH)	11,840	10,381	10,088	9,854	9,121	99.00%	98.53%	96.70%	96.03%	93.00%
Black or African American alone (NH)	10	11	41	58	50	0.08%	0.10%	0.39%	0.57%	0.51%
Native American or Alaska Native alone (NH)	21	43	36	38	33	0.18%	0.41%	0.35%	0.37%	0.34%
Asian alone (NH)	14	24	16	36	54	0.12%	0.23%	0.15%	0.35%	0.55%
Native Hawaiian or Pacific Islander alone (NH)	x	x	1	2	8	x	x	0.01%	0.02%	0.08%
Other race alone (NH)	2	0	1	6	15	0.02%	0.00%	0.01%	0.06%	0.15%
Mixed race or Multiracial (NH)	x	x	84	89	286	x	x	0.81%	0.87%	2.92%
Hispanic or Latino (any race)	72	77	165	178	241	0.60%	0.73%	1.58%	1.73%	2.46%
Total	11,959	10,536	10,432	10,261	9,808	100.00%	100.00%	100.00%	100.00%	100.00%

=== 2010 census ===
As of the 2010 census, there were 10,261 people, 4,204 households, and 2,694 families residing in the county. The population density was 23.43 people per square mile (9.05 people/km^{2}). There were 5,023 housing units at an average density of 11.47 units per square mile (4.43 units/km^{2}). The racial makeup of the county was 96.94% White, 0.57% Black or African American, 0.42% Native American, 0.36% Asian, 0.03% Pacific Islander, 6.53% from other races, and 1.02% from two or more races. Approximately 1.73% of the population were Hispanic or Latino of any race.

There were 4,204 households, out of which 28.28% had children under the age of 18 living with them, 51.05% were married couples living together, 8.68% had a female householder with no husband present, and 35.92% were non-families. 31.14% of all households were made up of individuals, and 15.37% had someone living alone who was 65 years of age or older. The average household size was 2.36 and the average family size was 2.94.

In the county, the population was spread out, with 24.04% under the age of 18, 9.27% from 18 to 24, 20.29% from 25 to 44, 25.93% from 45 to 64, and 20.47% who were 65 years of age or older. The median age was 41.6 years. For every 100 females there were 91.22 males. For every 100 females age 18 and over, there were 91.03 males.

The median income for a household in the county was $35,239, and the median income for a family was $45,959. Males had a median income of $31,843 versus $25,231 for females. The per capita income for the county was $18,148. About 10.2% of families and 13.3% of the population were below the poverty line, including 13.4% of those under age 18 and 16.7% of those age 65 or over.

=== Religion ===
According to the Association of Religion Data Archives County Membership Report (2010), Grundy County is sometimes regarded as being on the northern edge of the Bible Belt, with evangelical Protestantism being the majority religion. The most predominant denominations among residents in Grundy County who adhere to a religion are Southern Baptists (49.86%), United Methodists (13.51%), and Disciples of Christ (6.95%).

== Education ==
=== Public schools ===
- Grundy County R-V School District – Galt
  - Grundy County Elementary School (K-06)
  - Grundy County High School (07-12)
- Laredo R-VII School District – Laredo
  - Laredo Elementary School (K-08)
- Pleasant View R-VI School District – Trenton
  - Pleasant View Elementary School (PK-08)
- Spickard R-II School District – Spickard
  - Spickard Elementary School (PK-06)
- Trenton R-IX School District – Trenton
  - Rissler Elementary School (PK-04)
  - Trenton Middle School (05-08)
  - Trenton High School (09-12)

=== Private schools ===
- Pleasant Hill School – Jamesport (02-09) – Amish

=== Public libraries ===
- Grundy County Jewett Norris Library

== Communities ==
=== Cities ===
- Galt
- Laredo
- Spickard
- Tindall
- Trenton (county seat)

=== Village ===
- Brimson

=== Census-designated places ===
- Edinburg
- Leisure Lake

=== Unincorporated communities ===
- Alpha
- Buttsville
- Dunlap
- Hickory Creek
- Lindley

=== Townships ===
Grundy County has 13 political townships: each having a trustee, multiple members, and a clerk.

- Franklin
- Harrison
- Jackson
- Jefferson
- Liberty
- Lincoln
- Madison
- Marion
- Myers
- Taylor
- Trenton
- Washington
- Wilson

== Notable people ==
- Harold Leland “Hal” Call, LGBT rights activist, pornographer and publisher
- Enoch Crowder, U.S. Army general and Ambassador to Cuba
- Roy Gardner, bank robber
- Arthur M. Hyde, Governor of Missouri (1921-1925), U.S. Secretary of Agriculture (1929-1933)
- Yank Lawson, Dixieland trumpet player
- Gregg Miller, inventor and author

== Politics ==
=== Local ===
The Republican Party predominantly controls politics at the local level in Grundy County. Republicans hold all of the elected positions in the county.

Grundy County, Missouri

Elected countywide officials
Assessor	Nathanial Curtis	Republican
Circuit Clerk	Becky Stanturf	Republican
County Clerk	Courtney Campbell	Republican
Commissioner (presiding)	Phillip Ray	Republican
Commissioner (district 1)	Don Sager	Republican
Commissioner (district 2)	Brad Chumbley	Republican
Coroner	Dewayne Slater	Republican
Prosecuting Attorney	Kelly Puckett	Republican
Public Administrator	Adria Moore	Republican
Sheriff	Rodney Herring	Republican
Treasurer	Barbara Harris	Republican

=== State ===
Past Gubernatorial Elections Results
Year	Republican	Democratic	Third Parties
2024	81.14% 3,533	17.18% 748	1.67% 73
2020	79.91% 3,537	18.55% 821	1.54% 68
2016	68.59% 3,046	28.57% 1,269	2.84% 126
2012	53.86% 2,352	42.41% 1,852	3.73% 163
2008	53.65% 2,512	43.61% 2,042	2.73% 128
2004	58.87% 2,836	39.24% 1,890	1.89% 91
2000	64.50% 3,029	32.37% 1,520	3.14% 147
1996	32.82% 1,528	64.83% 3,018	2.34% 109

All of Grundy County is a part of Missouri's 2nd District in the Missouri House of Representatives.

Missouri House of Representatives — District 2 — Grundy County (2022)
Party	Candidate	Votes	%	±%
Republican	Mazzie Christensen	10,606	100.00%	+17.62

All of Grundy County is a part of Missouri's 12th District in the Missouri Senate

Missouri Senate — District 12 — Grundy County (2022)
Party	Candidate	Votes	%	±%
Republican	Rusty Black	51,470	80.8%	
Democratic	Michael J. Baumli	12,254	19.2%	

=== Federal ===
All of Grundy County is included in Missouri's 6th Congressional District and is currently represented by Sam Graves (R-Tarkio) in the U.S. House of Representatives. Graves was elected to an eleventh term in 2020 over Democratic challenger Gena Ross.

U.S. House of Representatives – Missouri’s 6th Congressional District – Grundy County (2020)
Party	Candidate	Votes	%	±%
Republican	Sam Graves	3,662	83.28%	+2.68
Democratic	Gena L. Ross	661	15.03%	−1.39
Libertarian	Jim Higgins	74	1.68%	−1.30

U.S. House of Representatives – Missouri's 6th Congressional District – Grundy County (2018)
Party	Candidate	Votes	%	±%
Republican	Sam Graves	2,921	80.60%	+0.42
Democratic	Henry Robert Martin	595	16.42%	−0.54
Libertarian	Dan Hogan	108	2.98%	+1.03

Grundy County, along with the rest of the state of Missouri, is represented in the U.S. Senate by Josh Hawley (R-Columbia) and Roy Blunt (R-Strafford).

U.S. Senate – Class I – Grundy County (2018)
Party	Candidate	Votes	%	±%
Republican	Josh Hawley	2,641	72.68%	+28.65
Democratic	Claire McCaskill	871	23.97%	−22.82
Independent	Craig O'Dear	65	1.79%	
Libertarian	Japheth Campbell	39	1.07%	−8.12
Green	Jo Crain	18	0.50%	+0.50

Blunt was elected to a second term in 2016 over then-Missouri Secretary of State Jason Kander.

U.S. Senate — Class III — Grundy County (2016)
Party	Candidate	Votes	%	±%
Republican	Roy Blunt	2,898	65.34%	+21.32
Democratic	Jason Kander	1,325	29.88%	−16.91
Libertarian	Jonathan Dine	91	2.05%	−7.14
Green	Johnathan McFarland	57	1.29%	+1.29
Constitution	Fred Ryman	64	1.44%	+1.44

==== Political culture ====
United States presidential election results for Grundy County, Missouri
Year	Republican		Democratic		Third party(ies)	
Year	No.	%	No.	%	No.	%
1888	2,344	62.04%	1,363	36.08%	71	1.88%
1892	2,468	60.71%	1,375	33.83%	222	5.46%
1896	2,778	62.05%	1,675	37.41%	24	0.54%
1900	2,576	61.61%	1,532	36.64%	73	1.75%
1904	2,596	67.15%	1,195	30.91%	75	1.94%
1908	2,407	62.71%	1,359	35.41%	72	1.88%
1912	1,051	26.83%	1,310	33.44%	1,556	39.72%
1916	2,481	56.72%	1,789	40.90%	104	2.38%
1920	5,123	64.25%	2,721	34.13%	129	1.62%
1924	3,782	50.65%	2,367	31.70%	1,318	17.65%
1928	5,226	68.73%	2,332	30.67%	46	0.60%
1932	2,953	42.07%	4,006	57.07%	61	0.87%
1936	4,521	51.59%	4,187	47.78%	55	0.63%
1940	4,558	54.24%	3,813	45.37%	33	0.39%
1944	4,158	58.02%	2,997	41.82%	12	0.17%
1948	3,331	51.15%	3,177	48.79%	4	0.06%
1952	4,790	63.40%	2,747	36.36%	18	0.24%
1956	4,139	60.06%	2,752	39.94%	0	0.00%
1960	4,422	64.68%	2,415	35.32%	0	0.00%
1964	2,411	41.76%	3,363	58.24%	0	0.00%
1968	3,213	57.29%	1,976	35.24%	419	7.47%
1972	3,969	73.54%	1,428	26.46%	0	0.00%
1976	2,646	50.18%	2,597	49.25%	30	0.57%
1980	2,890	56.60%	2,064	40.42%	152	2.98%
1984	3,156	62.91%	1,861	37.09%	0	0.00%
1988	2,668	56.38%	2,052	43.36%	12	0.25%
1992	1,749	34.26%	1,968	38.55%	1,388	27.19%
1996	1,883	40.08%	2,073	44.13%	742	15.79%
2000	2,976	63.21%	1,563	33.20%	169	3.59%
2004	3,172	65.97%	1,561	32.47%	75	1.56%
2008	3,006	63.42%	1,580	33.33%	154	3.25%
2012	3,030	69.27%	1,212	27.71%	132	3.02%
2016	3,462	78.18%	780	17.62%	186	4.20%
2020	3,585	80.80%	799	18.01%	53	1.19%
2024	3,582	81.34%	784	17.80%	38	0.86%

At the presidential level, Grundy County is reliably Republican. Like many of the rural counties throughout Missouri, Donald Trump carried the county easily in 2016 and 2020. Bill Clinton was the last Democratic presidential nominee to carry Grundy County in 1996 with a plurality of the vote, and a Democrat hasn't won majority support from the county's voters in a presidential election since Lyndon Johnson in 1964.

Like most rural areas throughout northern Missouri, voters in Grundy County generally adhere to socially and culturally conservative principles which tend to influence their Republican leanings. In 2004, Missourians voted on a constitutional amendment to define marriage as the union between a man and a woman—it overwhelmingly won in Grundy County with 77% of the vote. The initiative passed the state with 71% support from voters. In 2006, Missourians voted on a constitutional amendment to fund and legalize embryonic stem cell research in the state—it failed in Grundy County with 55% voting against the measure. The initiative narrowly passed the state with 51% of support from voters as Missouri became one of the first states in the nation to approve embryonic stem cell research. Despite Grundy County's longstanding tradition of supporting socially conservative platforms, voters in the county have a penchant for advancing populist causes like increasing the minimum wage. In 2006, Missourians voted on a proposition (Proposition B) to increase the minimum wage in the state to $6.50 an hour—it passed Grundy County with 61% of the vote. The proposition strongly passed every single county in Missouri with 79% voting in favor. (During the same election, voters in five other states also strongly approved increases in the minimum wage.) In 2018, Missourians voted on a proposition (Proposition A) concerning right to work, the outcome of which ultimately reversed the right to work legislation passed in the state the previous year. 63.53% of Grundy County voters cast their ballots to overturn the law.

=== Missouri presidential preference primaries ===
==== 2020 ====
The 2020 presidential primaries for both the Democratic and Republican parties were held in Missouri on March 10. On the Democratic side, former Vice President Joe Biden (D-Delaware) both won statewide and carried Grundy County by a wide margin. Biden went on to defeat President Donald Trump in the general election.

Missouri Democratic Presidential Primary – Grundy County (2020)
Party	Candidate	Votes	%	±%
Democratic	Joe Biden	305	66.89	
Democratic	Bernie Sanders	116	25.44	
Democratic	Tulsi Gabbard	6	1.32	
Democratic	Others/Uncommitted	29	6.36	

Incumbent President Donald Trump (R-Florida) faced a primary challenge from former Massachusetts Governor Bill Weld, but won both Grundy County and statewide by large margins.

Missouri Republican Presidential Primary – Grundy County (2020)
Party	Candidate	Votes	%	±%
Republican	Donald Trump	886	98.66	
Republican	Bill Weld	5	0.56	
Republican	Others/Uncommitted	7	0.78	

==== 2016 ====
The 2016 presidential primaries for both the Republican and Democratic parties were held in Missouri on March 15. Businessman Donald Trump (R-New York) narrowly won the state overall, but received majority support in Grundy County.

Missouri Republican Presidential Primary – Grundy County (2016)
Party	Candidate	Votes	%	±%
Republican	Donald Trump	978	50.10	
Republican	Ted Cruz	673	34.48	
Republican	John Kasich	163	8.35	
Republican	Marco Rubio	79	4.05	
Republican	Others/Uncommitted	59	3.02	

On the Democratic side, former Secretary of State Hillary Clinton (D-New York) won statewide by a slim margin, but Senator Bernie Sanders (I-Vermont) carried Grundy County.

Missouri Democratic Presidential Primary – Grundy County (2016)
Party	Candidate	Votes	%	±%
Democratic	Bernie Sanders	262	53.36	
Democratic	Hillary Clinton	219	44.60	
Democratic	Others/Uncommitted	10	2.03	

==== 2012 ====
The 2012 Missouri Republican Presidential Primary's results were nonbinding on the state's national convention delegates. Voters in Grundy County supported former U.S. Senator Rick Santorum (R-Pennsylvania), who finished first in the state at large, but eventually lost the nomination to former Governor Mitt Romney (R-Massachusetts). Delegates to the congressional district and state conventions were chosen at a county caucus, which selected delegations favoring U.S. Representative Ron Paul (R-Texas). Incumbent President Barack Obama easily won the Missouri Democratic Primary and renomination. He defeated Romney in the general election.

==== 2008 ====
In 2008, the Missouri Republican Presidential Primary was closely contested, with Senator John McCain (R-Arizona) prevailing and eventually winning the nomination.

Missouri Republican Presidential Primary – Grundy County (2008)
Party	Candidate	Votes	%	±%
Republican	John McCain	377	34.46	
Republican	Mike Huckabee	361	33.00	
Republican	Ron Paul	210	19.20	
Republican	Mitt Romney	122	11.15	
Republican	Others/Uncommitted	24	2.19	

Then-Senator Hillary Clinton (D-New York) received more votes than any candidate from either party in Grundy County during the 2008 presidential primary. Despite initial reports that Clinton had won Missouri, Barack Obama (D-Illinois), also a Senator at the time, narrowly defeated her statewide and later became that year's Democratic nominee, going on to win the presidency.

Missouri Democratic Presidential Primary – Grundy County (2008)
Party	Candidate	Votes	%	±%
Democratic	Hillary Clinton	485	57.95	
Democratic	Barack Obama	323	38.59	
Democratic	Others/Uncommitted	29	3.47	

== See also ==
- National Register of Historic Places listings in Grundy County, Missouri
