= 1912 Missouri Attorney General election =

- November 5, 1912

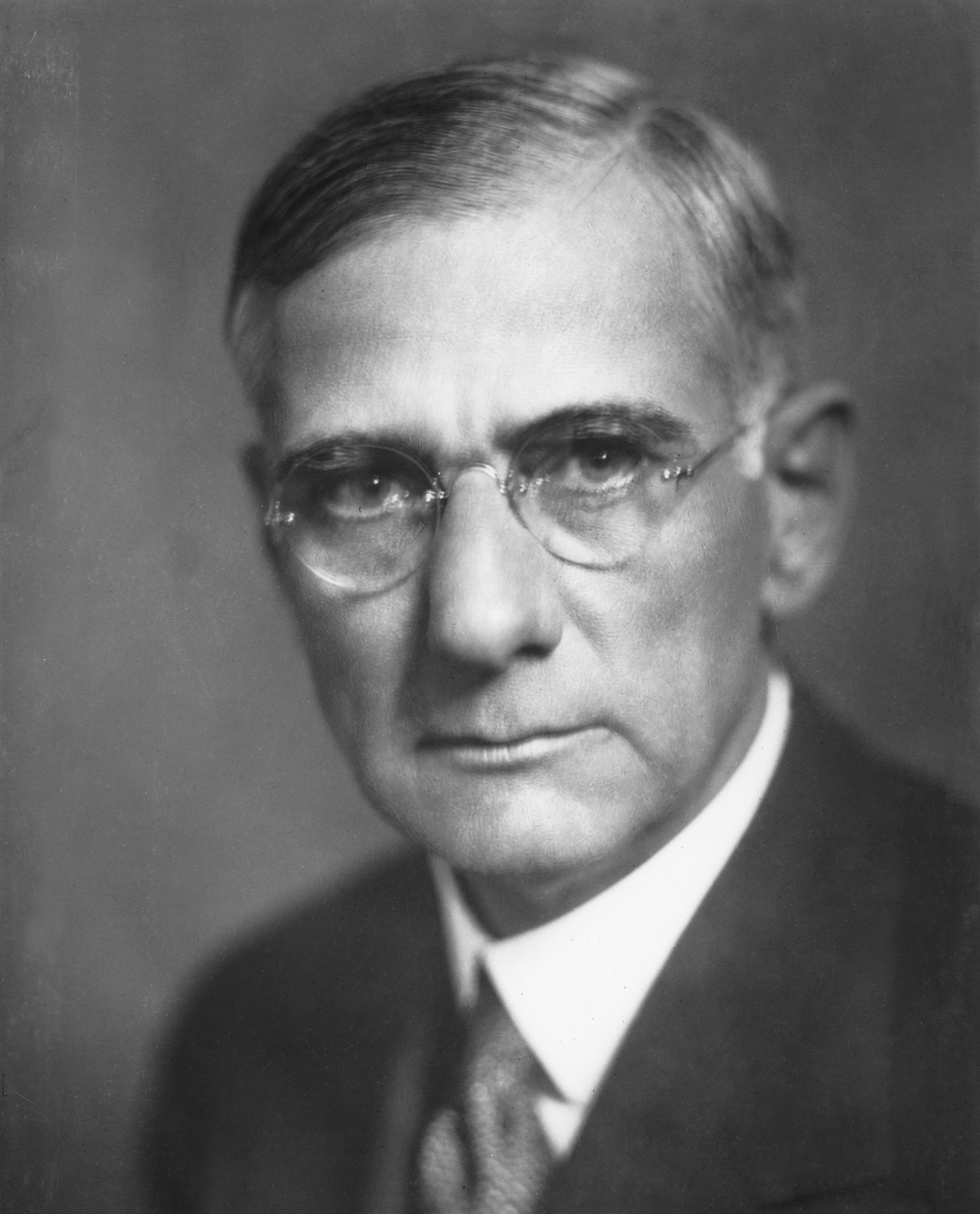
Nominee	John T. Barker	James H. Mason	Arthur M. Hyde
Party	Democratic	Republican	Progressive
Popular vote	332,885	215,016	115,494
Percentage	47.63%	30.77%	16.53%
Attorney General before election
Elliott Woolfolk Major
Democratic
Elected Attorney General
John T. Barker
Democratic

The 1912 Missouri Attorney General election was held on November 5, 1912, in order to elect the attorney general of Missouri. Democratic nominee John T. Barker defeated Republican nominee James H. Mason, Progressive nominee and incumbent mayor of Princeton Arthur M. Hyde, Socialist nominee Walter Bundy, Prohibition nominee Richard B. Wilcox and Socialist Labor nominee George H. Bloebaum.

== General election ==
On election day, November 5, 1912, Democratic nominee John T. Barker won the election by a margin of 117,869 votes against his foremost opponent Republican nominee James H. Mason, thereby retaining Democratic control over the office of attorney general. Barker was sworn in as the 26th attorney general of Missouri on January 13, 1913.

=== Results ===
Missouri Attorney General election, 1912
Party	Candidate	Votes	%
Democratic	John T. Barker	332,885	47.63
Republican	James H. Mason	215,016	30.77
Progressive	Arthur M. Hyde	115,494	16.53
Socialist	Walter Bundy	28,417	4.07
Prohibition	Richard B. Wilcox	5,215	0.75
Socialist Labor	George H. Bloebaum	1,837	0.25
Total votes		698,864	100.00
Democratic hold			

== See also ==
- 1912 Missouri gubernatorial election
