= 1920 Missouri Secretary of State election =

- November 2, 1920

Nominee	Charles Becker	John Leo Sullivan
Party	Republican	Democratic
Popular vote	726,668	575,090
Percentage	54.80%	43.37%
Secretary of State before election
John Leo Sullivan
Democratic
Elected Secretary of State
Charles Becker
Republican

The 1920 Missouri Secretary of State election was held on November 2, 1920, in order to elect the secretary of state of Missouri. Republican nominee Charles Becker defeated Democratic nominee and incumbent secretary of state John Leo Sullivan, Socialist nominee David S. Landis, Farmer-Worker nominee Dan Richmond and Socialist Labor nominee Charles Sheffler.

== General election ==
On election day, November 2, 1920, Republican nominee Charles Becker won the election by a margin of 151,578 votes against his foremost opponent Democratic nominee John Leo Sullivan, thereby gaining Republican control over the office of secretary of state. Becker was sworn in as the 24th secretary of state of Missouri on January 10, 1921.

=== Results ===
Missouri Secretary of State election, 1920
Party	Candidate	Votes	%
Republican	Charles Becker	726,668	54.80
Democratic	John Leo Sullivan (incumbent)	575,090	43.37
Socialist	David S. Landis	19,561	1.48
Farmer–Labor	Dan Richmond	3,035	0.23
Socialist Labor	Charles Sheffler	1,641	0.12
Total votes		1,325,995	100.00
Republican gain from Democratic			

== See also ==
- 1920 Missouri gubernatorial election
