= 1916 Missouri Secretary of State election =

- November 7, 1916

Nominee	John Leo Sullivan	William C. Askin
Party	Democratic	Republican
Popular vote	389,210	375,764
Percentage	49.59%	47.88%
Secretary of State before election
Cornelius Roach
Democratic
Elected Secretary of State
John Leo Sullivan
Democratic

The 1916 Missouri Secretary of State election was held on November 7, 1916, in order to elect the secretary of state of Missouri. Democratic nominee John Leo Sullivan defeated Republican nominee William C. Askin, Socialist nominee Otto Vierling, Prohibition nominee William M. Godwin and Socialist Labor nominee William Wesley Cox.

== General election ==
On election day, November 7, 1916, Democratic nominee John Leo Sullivan won the election by a margin of 13,446 votes against his foremost opponent Republican nominee William C. Askin, thereby retaining Democratic control over the office of secretary of state. Sullivan was sworn in as the 23rd secretary of state of Missouri on January 8, 1917.

=== Results ===
Missouri Secretary of State election, 1916
Party	Candidate	Votes	%
Democratic	John Leo Sullivan	389,210	49.59
Republican	William C. Askin	375,764	47.88
Socialist	Otto Vierling	14,765	1.88
Prohibition	William M. Godwin	4,171	0.53
Socialist Labor	William Wesley Cox	970	0.12
Total votes		784,880	100.00
Democratic hold			

== See also ==
- 1916 Missouri gubernatorial election
