= 1920 Missouri Attorney General election =

- November 2, 1920
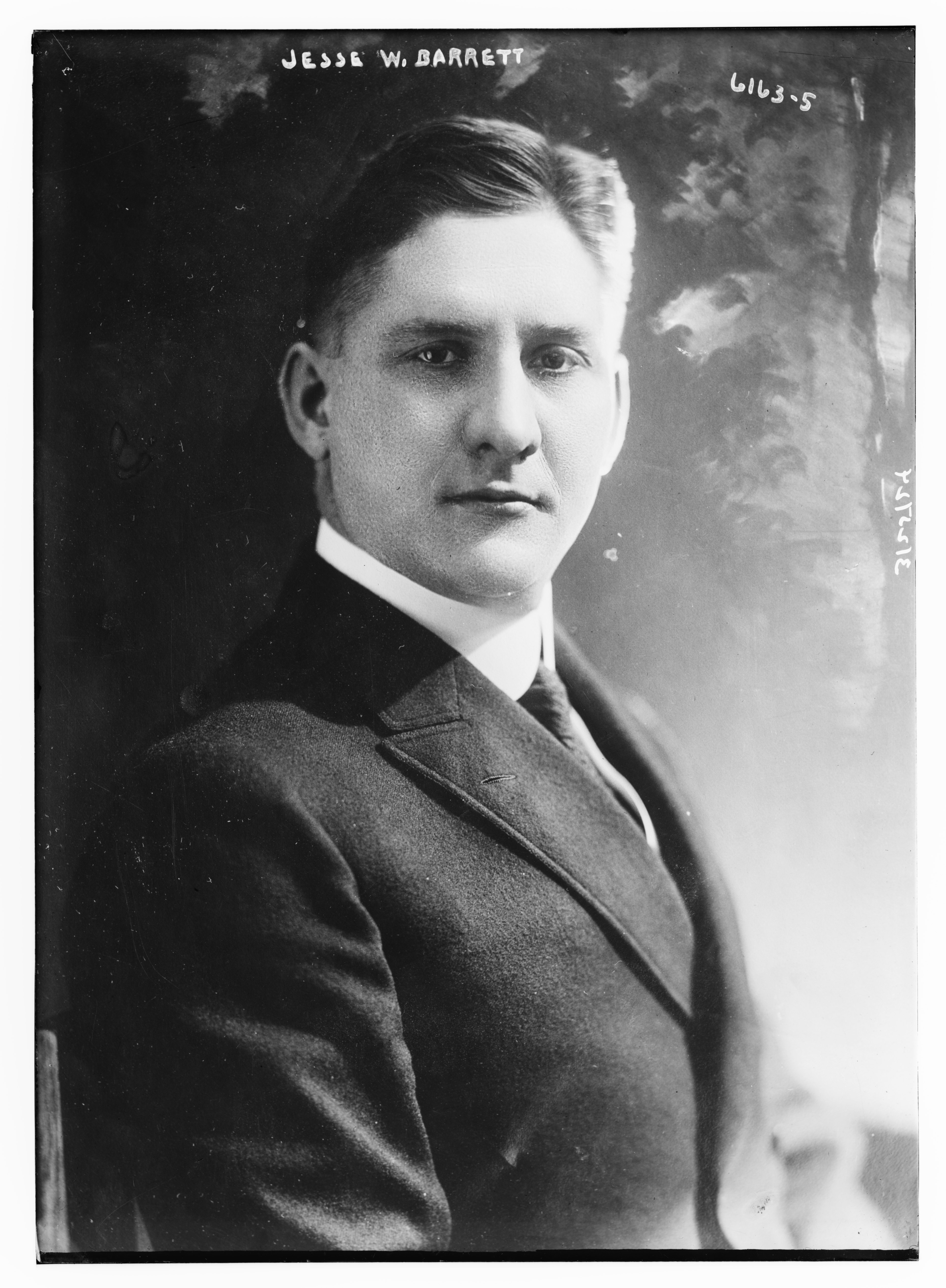

Nominee	Jesse W. Barrett	Willis H. Meredith
Party	Republican	Democratic
Popular vote	722,405	582,117
Percentage	55.17%	44.46%
Attorney General before election
Frank Winton McAllister
Democratic
Elected Attorney General
Jesse W. Barrett
Republican

The 1920 Missouri Attorney General election was held on November 2, 1920, in order to elect the attorney general of Missouri. Republican nominee Jesse W. Barrett defeated Democratic nominee Willis H. Meredith, Farmer-Worker nominee Julian Andersen and Socialist Labor nominee George Hartwig.

== General election ==
On election day, November 2, 1920, Republican nominee Jesse W. Barrett won the election by a margin of 140,288 votes against his foremost opponent Democratic nominee Willis H. Meredith, thereby gaining Republican control over the office of attorney general. Barrett was sworn in as the 28th attorney general of Missouri on January 10, 1921.

=== Results ===
Missouri Attorney General election, 1920
Party	Candidate	Votes	%
Republican	Jesse W. Barrett	722,405	55.17
Democratic	Willis H. Meredith	582,117	44.46
Farmer–Labor	Julian Andersen	3,157	0.24
Socialist Labor	George Hartwig	1,723	0.13
Total votes		1,309,402	100.00
Republican gain from Democratic			

== See also ==
- 1920 Missouri gubernatorial election
