= Governor Gardner =

Governor Gardner may refer to:

- Booth Gardner (1936–2013), 19th Governor of Washington
- Frederick D. Gardner (1869–1933), 34th Governor of Missouri
- Henry Gardner (1819–1892), 23rd Governor of Massachusetts
- Oliver Max Gardner (1882–1947), 57th Governor of North Carolina

== See also ==
- William Tudor Gardiner (1892–1953), 55th Governor of Maine
