= 1916 Missouri State Auditor election =

- November 7, 1916

Nominee	George Ernst Hackman	John Pemberton Gordon
Party	Republican	Democratic
Popular vote	387,294	378,214
Percentage	49.33%	48.17%
State Auditor before election
John Pemberton Gordon
Democratic
Elected State Auditor
George Ernst Hackman
Republican

The 1916 Missouri State Auditor election was held on November 7, 1916, in order to elect the state auditor of Missouri. Republican nominee George Ernst Hackman defeated Democratic nominee and incumbent state auditor John Pemberton Gordon, Socialist nominee William R. Bowden, Prohibition nominee B. F. Sapp and Socialist Labor nominee Frederick Spalti.

== General election ==
On election day, November 7, 1916, Republican nominee George Ernst Hackman won the election by a margin of 9,080 votes against his foremost opponent Democratic nominee John Pemberton Gordon, thereby gaining Republican control over the office of state auditor. Hackman was sworn in as the 23rd state auditor of Missouri on January 8, 1917.

=== Results ===
Missouri State Auditor election, 1916
Party	Candidate	Votes	%
Republican	George Ernst Hackman	387,294	49.33
Democratic	John Pemberton Gordon (incumbent)	378,214	48.17
Socialist	William R. Bowden	14,817	1.89
Prohibition	B. F. Sapp	3,869	0.49
Socialist Labor	Frederick Spalti	961	0.12
Total votes		785,155	100.00
Republican gain from Democratic			

== See also ==
- 1916 Missouri gubernatorial election
