= William Marion Jardine =

American diplomat and politician

William Jardine
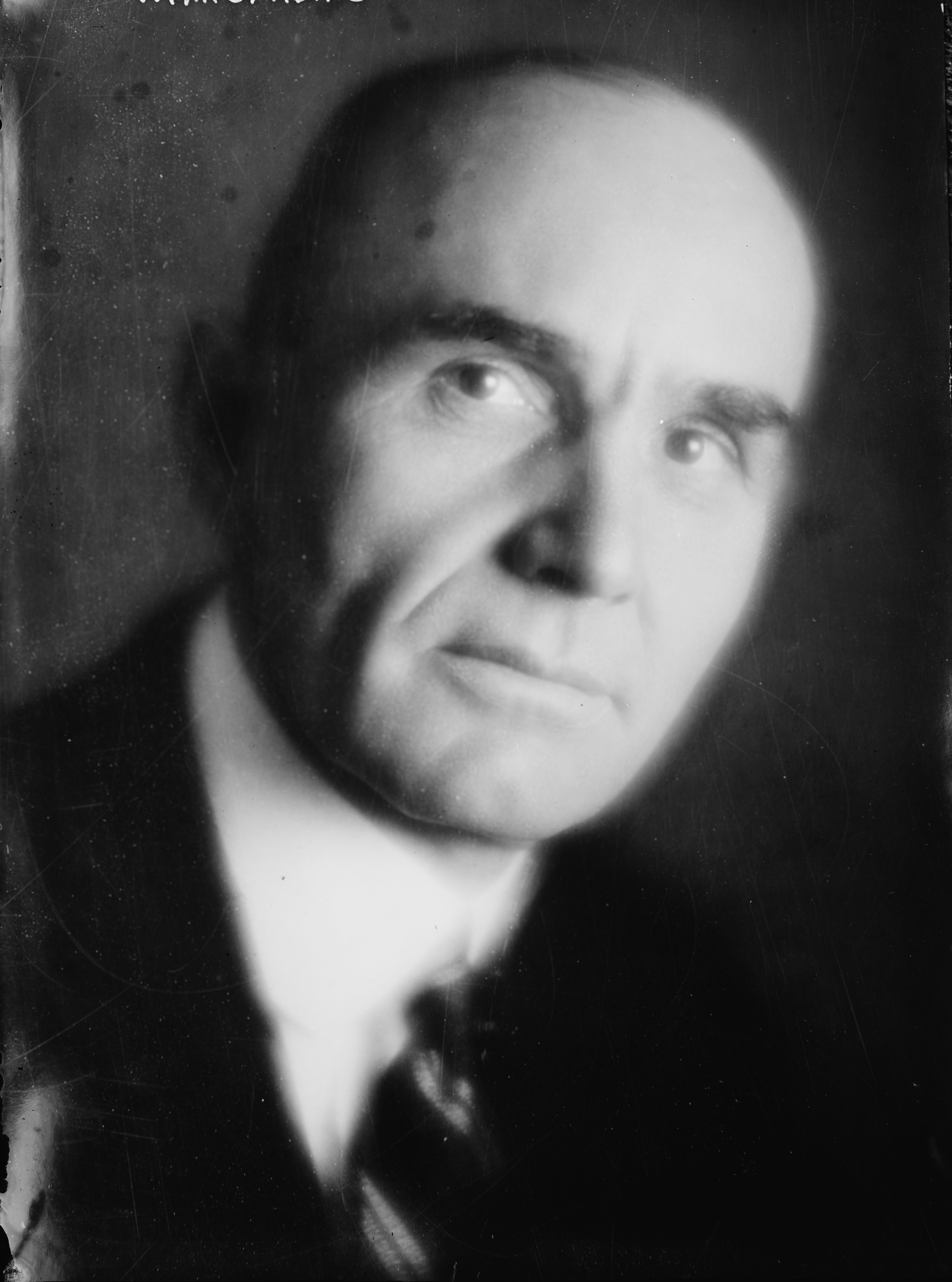

24th Kansas State Treasurer
- In office October 3, 1933 – April 1, 1934
- Governor: Alf Landon
- Preceded by: Tom Boyd
- Succeeded by: J. J. Rhodes

26th United States Minister to Egypt
- In office October 13, 1930 – September 5, 1933
- President: Herbert Hoover
- Preceded by: Franklin Gunther
- Succeeded by: Bert Fish

9th United States Secretary of Agriculture
- In office March 5, 1925 – March 4, 1929
- President: Calvin Coolidge
- Preceded by: Howard Mason Gore
- Succeeded by: Arthur M. Hyde

Personal details
- Born: William Marion Jardine; January 16, 1879 Oneida County, Idaho, U.S.
- Died: January 17, 1955 (aged 76) San Antonio, Texas, U.S.
- Party: Republican
- Spouse: Effie Nebeker
- Children: 3
- Education: Utah State University, Logan (BS); University of Illinois at Urbana–Champaign

William Marion Jardine (January 16, 1879 – January 17, 1955) was an American administrator and educator. He served as the United States secretary of agriculture from 1925 to 1929 and as the U.S. minister to Egypt from 1930 to 1933.

== Early life and education ==
Jardine was born in Oneida County, Idaho, to Rebecca and William Jardine. He graduated with a bachelor of science degree from Utah Agricultural College (today Utah State University) in Logan, Utah. On September 6, 1905, Jardine married the former Effie Lane Nebeker; they had three children. He attended graduate school at the University of Illinois at Urbana-Champaign in 1906.

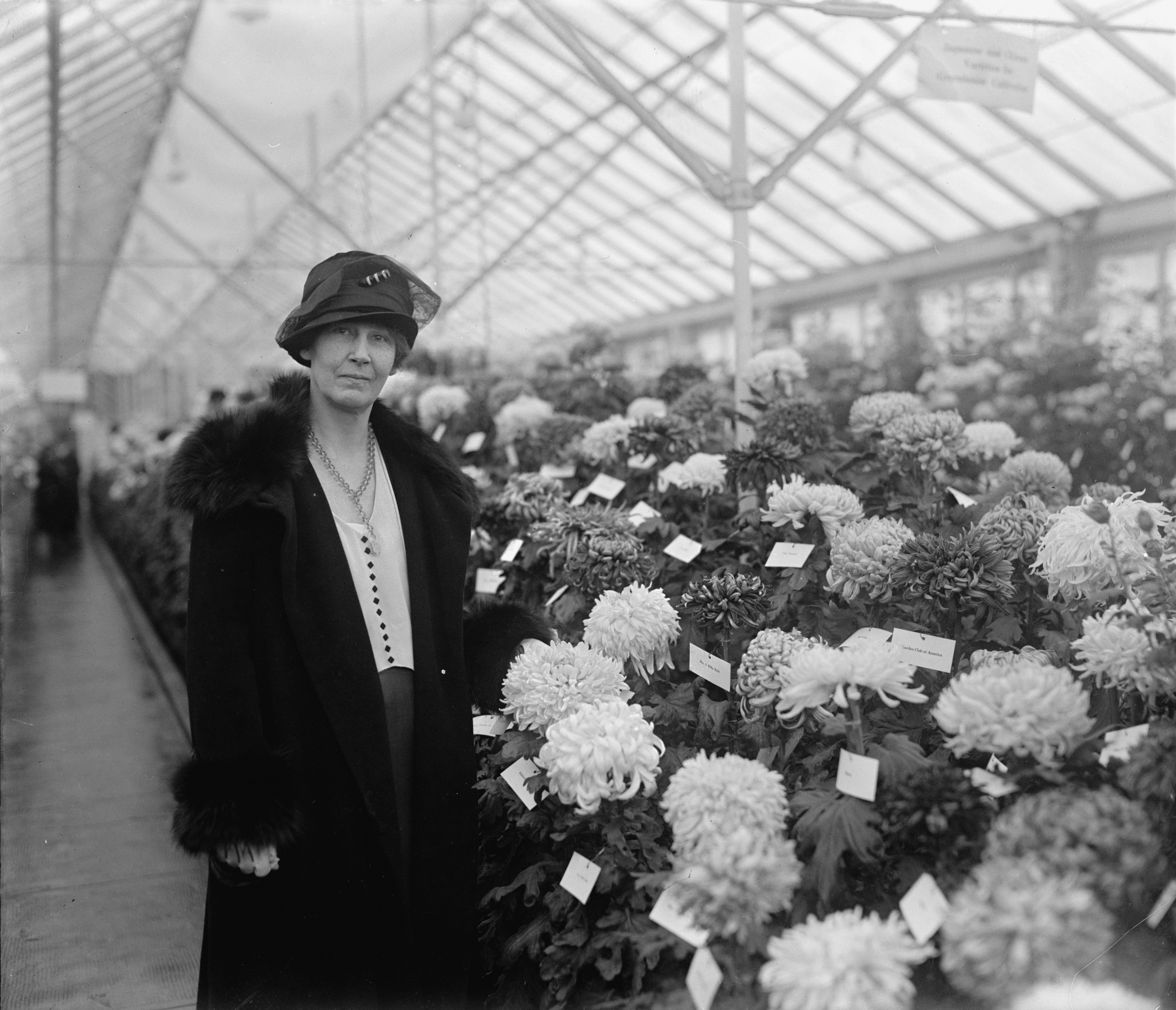
William M. Jardine's wife, Effie Nebeker, photographed next to chrysanthemums November 5, 1925.

Jardine had a strong interest in practical farming. He was also attracted to the opportunities in education. He began his teaching in Utah, where he soon became professor of agronomy. In 1910, Jardine moved to Manhattan, Kansas, to accept the position of agronomist at the Kansas State Agricultural College. Three years later, Jardine was made dean of the Division of Agriculture and was Director of the Agriculture Experiment Station.

== President of Kansas State University ==
On March 1, 1918, Jardine became the seventh President of Kansas State University. He served until February 28, 1925, when he was succeeded by Francis D. Farrell. The office had been vacant after Henry J. Waters resigned to become managing editor of the Weekly Kansas City Star.

During his time in office, Jardine penned several handbooks, such as the "Suggestions for Teachers Giving Practical Instruction to City Boys in (a) Care and Handling of Work Horses (b) Care, Adjustment, and Use of Farm Machinery (c) Care and Handling of Dairy Cows and Milk", which was published by the Kansas State Council of Defense.

Jardine achieved an outstanding reputation for his work in agricultural education that extended far beyond the borders of the state of Kansas.

== Secretary of Agriculture ==
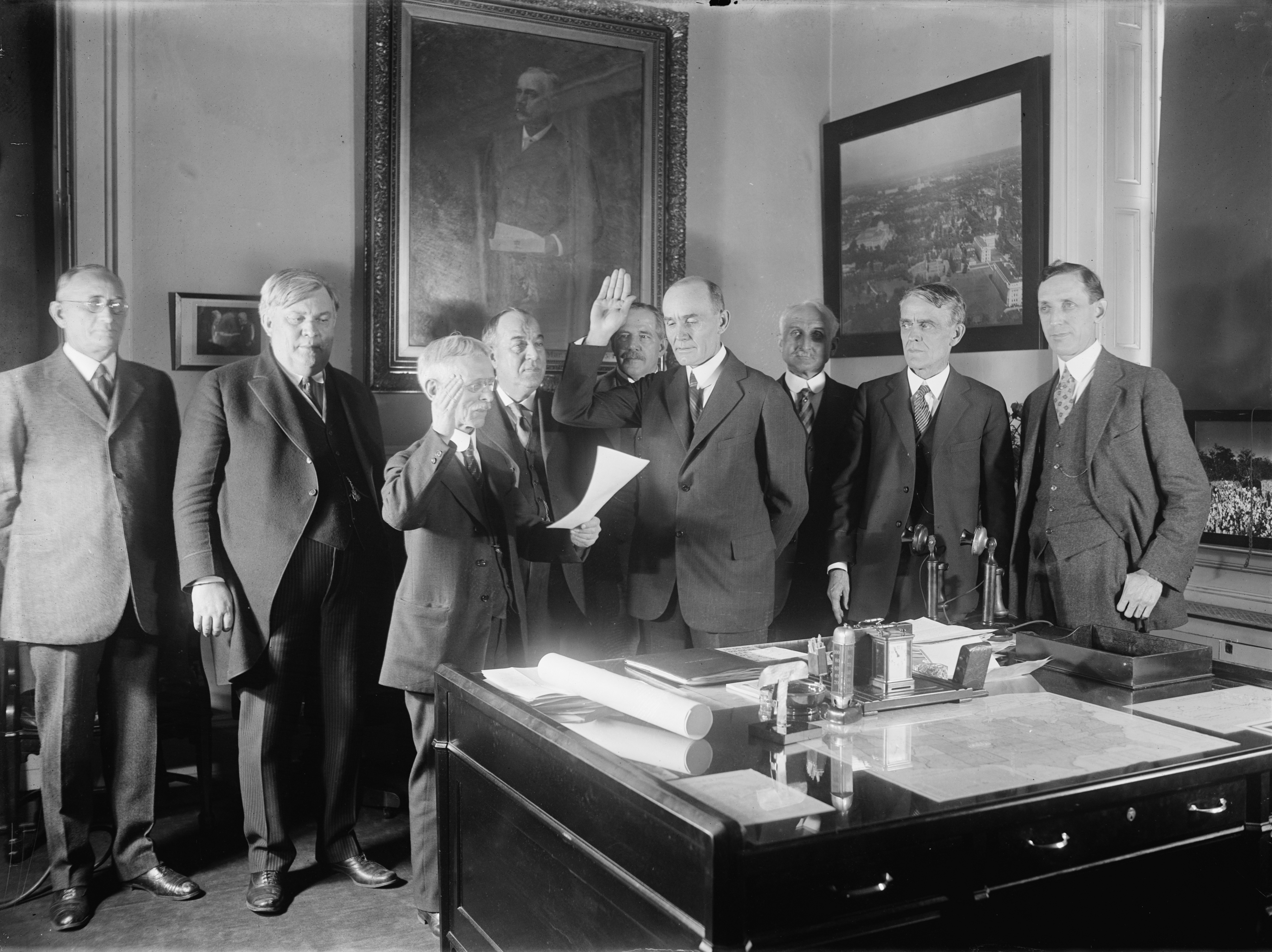
Jardine was sworn in office as the Secretary of Agriculture.

On March 5, 1925, President Calvin Coolidge appointed him United States Secretary of Agriculture, a position he held for the next four years.

== United States Minister to Egypt ==
At the end of the Coolidge administration on March 4, 1929, Jardine served in President Herbert Hoover's administration as the United States Minister to Egypt from October 13, 1930, until September 5, 1933.

== President of Municipal University of Wichita ==
After returning to Kansas in 1933, Jardine became the president of the Municipal University of Wichita (currently known as Wichita State University). Jardine was appointed by the Kansas State Treasurer from October 2, 1933, and he took the oath the following day. He served in this capacity from October 3, 1933, until 1949.

== Death ==
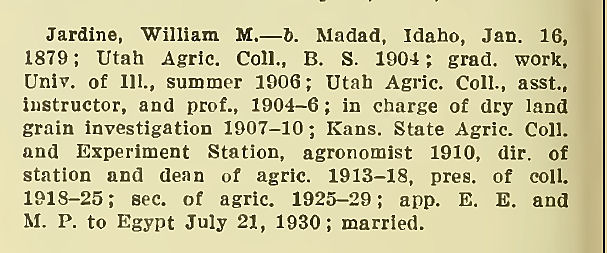
Biographic sketch of William M. Jardine from the July 1, 1933, Register of the Department of State

Jardine was very active in education and government services until his death on January 17, 1955, in San Antonio, Texas. He is interred at the Logan City Cemetery in Logan, Utah.

Jardine was a Congregationalist and was a member of a Freemasons, Rotary, Alpha Zeta, Beta Theta Pi, Phi Kappa Phi, and the Sigma Xi.

Jardine's papers are archived at Wichita State University in Kansas.

Political offices
Preceded by Tom Boyd	Kansas State Treasurer; 1933–1934	Succeeded by J. J. Rhodes
Preceded by Howard Mason Gore	U.S. Secretary of Agriculture; Served under: Calvin Coolidge; 1925–1929	Succeeded by Arthur M. Hyde
