= Laurance M. Hyde =

American judge

Laurance Mastick Hyde

Judge of the Supreme Court of Missouri
- In office 1943–1966

Personal details
- Born: February 2, 1892 Princeton, Missouri, U.S.

Military service
- Allegiance: United States
- Branch/service: United States Army

Laurance Mastick Hyde (February 2, 1892 – 1978) was a chief justice of the Missouri Supreme Court. He was a Republican.

Hyde was born in Princeton, Missouri and served in the U.S. Army during World War I. He was the justice and then the chief justice of the Missouri Supreme Court.

In 1949, Hyde co-founded and became the first president of the Conference of Chief Justices, which he helped create along with the Council of State Governments and several private foundations at a meeting in St. Louis called by him, along with New Jersey Chief Justice Arthur T. Vanderbilt and Nebraska Chief Justice Robert G. Simmons.

Some of his family members were also involved in politics. His father, Ira B. Hyde, was a representative from Missouri, and his brother, Arthur M. Hyde, was a Governor of Missouri.
