= Henry M. Pollard =

American politician (1836–1904)

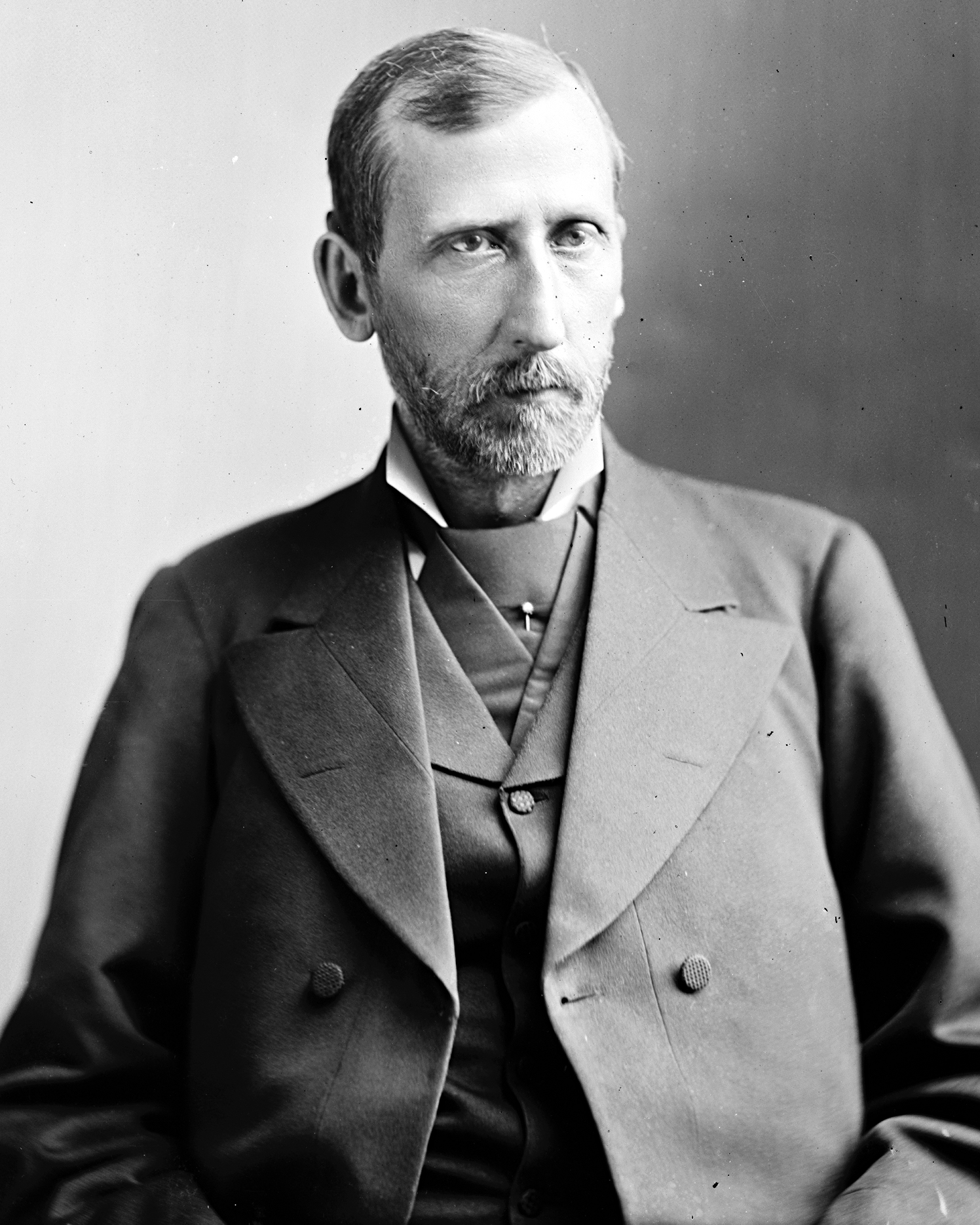
- Brady-Handy photo, Library of Congress

Member of the U.S. House of Representatives from Missouri's 10th district
- In office March 4, 1877 – March 3, 1879
- Preceded by: Rezin A. De Bolt
- Succeeded by: Gideon F. Rothwell

Mayor of Chillicothe, Missouri
- In office 1876–1877
- Preceded by: J. O. Trumbo
- Succeeded by: F. W. Trent

Personal details
- Born: June 14, 1836 Plymouth, Vermont, U.S.
- Died: February 24, 1904 (aged 67) St. Louis, Missouri, U.S.
- Resting place: Edgewood Cemetery, Chillicothe, Missouri, U.S.
- Party: Republican
- Spouse: Mariel Esther Adams (m. 1864)
- Children: 4
- Education: Dartmouth College; Albany Law School
- Profession: Lawyer

Military service
- Allegiance: United States (Union)
- Branch/service: Union Army
- Years of service: 1861–1865
- Rank: Major
- Unit: 8th Vermont Infantry Regiment
- Battles/wars: American Civil War

Henry M. Pollard (June 14, 1836 – February 24, 1904) was an American attorney and politician from Missouri. A native of Plymouth, Vermont, he served in the Union Army during the American Civil War and attained the rank of major in the 8th Vermont Infantry Regiment.

Pollard was raised and educated in Plymouth and graduated from Black River Academy. An 1857 graduate of Dartmouth College, he taught school in several western states, studied law in Milwaukee, and was admitted to the bar in 1861. At the outbreak of the American Civil War, he returned to Vermont and joined the Union Army. He served until the end of the war in 1865 and attained the rank of major as a member of the 8th Vermont Infantry Regiment. He then moved to Chillicothe, Missouri, where he became involved in politics as a Republican, including service as county attorney of Livingston County and mayor of Chillicothe.

In 1876, Pollard was elected to the United States House of Representatives and he served from March 4, 1877 to March 3, 1879. He was an unsuccessful candidate for reelection in 1878. In 1879, Pollard moved to St. Louis, where he continued practicing law. He died in St. Louis on February 24, 1904 and was interred at Edgewood Cemetery in Chillicothe.

== Early life ==
Henry Moses Pollard was born in Plymouth, Vermont on June 14, 1836, the son of Moses Pollard and Abigail (Brown) Pollard. He was educated in Plymouth and graduated from Black River Academy. He then attended Dartmouth College, from which he graduated with a Bachelor of Science degree in 1857.

After college, Pollard taught school in Kentucky, Iowa, and Wisconsin, then studied law at the Milwaukee firm of Walter S. Carter and William G. Whipple. He attained admitted to the bar in 1861, but deferred the start of a law practice so he could join the Union Army for the American Civil War.

== Start of career ==
Pollard joined Company I, 8th Vermont Infantry Regiment as a first lieutenant at the start of the war. The regiment served in initially in the Department of the Gulf, and later in the Civil War Defenses of Washington, and the Virginia Valley campaigns of 1864. Pollard remained in the service until the end of the war, and was discharged as a major in July 1865.

After leaving the army, Pollard completed his legal training with a six-month term at Albany Law School. He then moved to Chillicothe, Missouri, where he began to practice law in partnership with Joel Funk Asper. After Asper was elected to Congress, Pollard practiced in partnership with Judge Elbridge J. Broaddus. A Republican, Pollard was appointed county attorney of Livingston County in 1874. In 1876, he was elected Chillicothe's mayor, and he served until 1877.

== Later career ==
In 1876, Pollard was elected to represent Missouri's 10th congressional district in the United States House of Representatives. He served one term, March 4, 1877 to March 3, 1879. Pollard was an unsuccessful candidate for reelection in 1878, after which he resumed the practice of law.

Pollard moved to St. Louis in 1879, and he continued to practice law, first in partnership with Seneca N. Taylor, and later as a solo practitioner. Pollard was a founder of the New England Society of St. Louis, and served as its first president. He died in St. Louis on February 24, 1904. Pollard was buried at Edgewood Cemetery in Chillicothe.

== Works by ==
- "Recollections of Cedar Creek". War Papers and Personal Reminiscences, 1861–1865. Vol. I. St. Louis: Becktold & Co. 1892. pp. 278–286 – via Google Books.

U.S. House of Representatives
Preceded by Rezin A. De Bolt	Member of the U.S. House of Representatives from Missouri's 10th congressional district 1877–1879	Succeeded by Gideon F. Rothwell
