= Rezin A. De Bolt =

American politician (1828–1891)

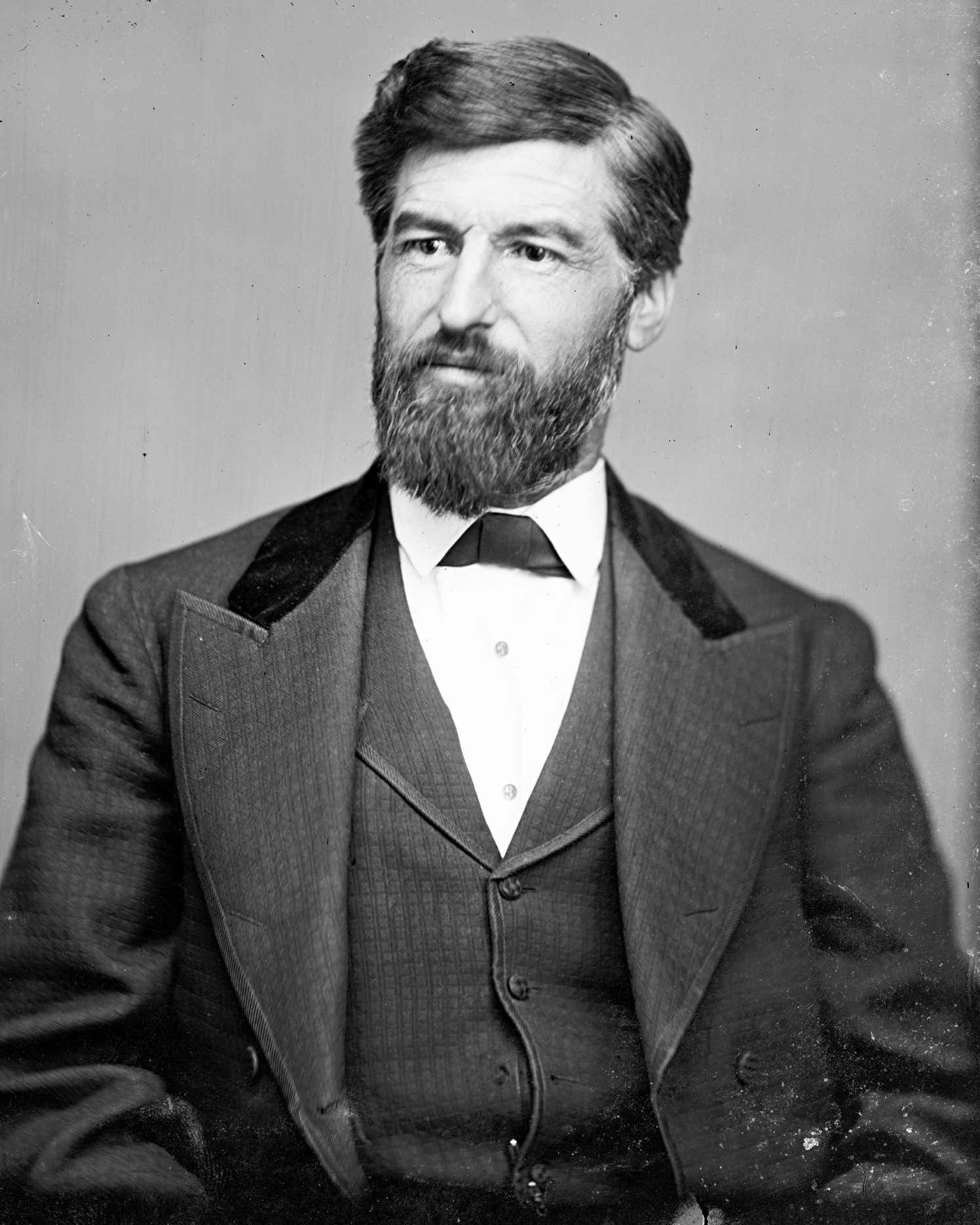

Member of the U.S. House of Representatives from Missouri's 10th district
- In office March 4, 1875 – March 3, 1877
- Preceded by: Ira B. Hyde
- Succeeded by: Henry M. Pollard

Personal details
- Born: January 20, 1828 near Basil, Ohio, U.S.
- Died: October 30, 1891 (aged 63) Trenton, Missouri, U.S.
- Resting place: Odd Fellows Cemetery
- Party: Democratic
- Occupation: Politician, lawyer, judge, tanner

Military service
- Allegiance: United States
- Branch/service: United States Army (Union army)
- Years of service: 1861–1863, 1864–1865
- Rank: Major

Rezin A. De Bolt (January 20, 1828 – October 30, 1891) was a U.S. representative from Missouri.

Born near Basil, Ohio, De Bolt attended the common schools. He was employed as a tanner. He studied law. He was admitted to the bar in 1856 and commenced practice in Lancaster, Ohio. He moved to Trenton, Missouri, in 1858 and continued the practice of his profession. He was appointed in 1859 and elected in 1860 commissioner of common schools for Grundy County. He entered the Union Army as captain in the Twenty-third Regiment, Missouri Volunteers, in 1861. Captured at the Battle of Shiloh, April 6, 1862, and held as prisoner until the following October. He resigned his commission in 1863 because of impaired health.

De Bolt was elected judge of the circuit court for the eleventh judicial circuit of Missouri in November 1863, which position he held by reelection until January 1, 1875. In 1864 again entered the United States service as major in the Forty-fourth Regiment, Missouri Volunteer Infantry. Mustered out in August 1865.

De Bolt was elected as a Democrat to the Forty-fourth Congress (March 4, 1875 – March 3, 1877). He was not a candidate for renomination in 1876. He resumed the practice of law. He died in Trenton, Missouri, October 30, 1891. He was interred in Odd Fellows Cemetery.

U.S. House of Representatives
Preceded by Ira B. Hyde	Member of the U.S. House of Representatives from Missouri's 10th congressional district 1875–1877	Succeeded by Henry M. Pollard
