= Ira B. Hyde =

American politician (1838–1926)

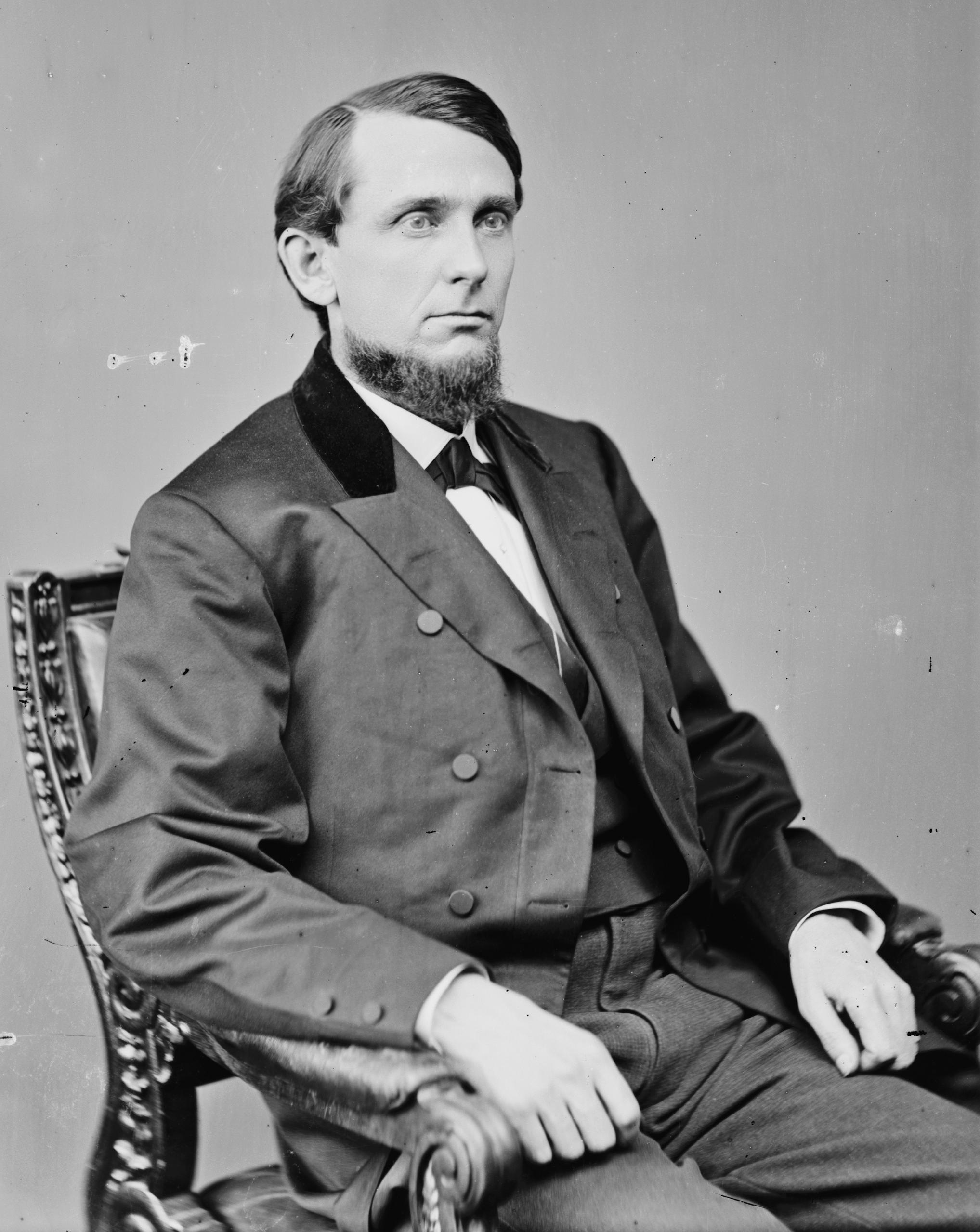
- Portrait of Hyde by Mathew Brady and Levin Corbin Handy, between 1865 and 1880

Member of the U.S. House of Representatives from Missouri's 10th district
- In office March 4, 1873 – March 3, 1875
- Preceded by: District created
- Succeeded by: Rezin A. DeBolt

Personal details
- Born: Ira Barnes Hyde; January 18, 1838 Guilford, New York, US
- Died: December 6, 1926 (aged 88) Princeton, Missouri, US
- Party: Republican
- Relations: Hyde family
- Children: Arthur, Ira Jr., Laurance

Military service
- Allegiance: United States
- Branch/service: United States Army (Union army)
- Years of service: October 1862 – December 1863
- Rank: Private
- Unit: 1st Minnesota Cavalry Regiment
- Battles/wars: American Civil War; Sioux Wars

Ira Barnes Hyde (January 18, 1838 – December 6, 1926) was an American politician and lawyer. A Republican, he was a member of the United States House of Representatives from Missouri.

== Early life and education ==
Hyde was born on January 18, 1838, in Guilford, New York, the youngest of seven children born to Frederick Hyde and Emily (née Lewis) Hyde. He was of English ancestry. The founder of the Hyde family in America settled in the Massachusetts Bay Colony in 1640, and was a founding council member of the New England Confederation in 1643. Hyde's maternal grandfather William Lewis served in the American Revolutionary War, most notably at the Siege of Yorktown. Hyde was educated at public schools, then at Norwich Academy. At age 15, he and his parents moved to East Cleveland, Ohio. He studied law at Oberlin College. In spring 1861, he moved to Saint Paul, Minnesota.

== Career ==
In 1861, Hyde was admitted to the bar by the Minnesota Supreme Court, and in 1862 commenced practice in Saint Paul. From October 1862 to December 1863, he served as a Private in Company F of the 1st Minnesota Cavalry Regiment of the Union army, and fought in the American Civil War. He also fought in the Sioux Wars. In 1865, he moved to Washington, D.C. and practiced law in partnership with Hobert G. Orton. In April 1866, they moved to Princeton, Missouri.

Hyde was a Republican. He was a delegate to numerous Missouri Republican Conventions, as well as to the 1884 Republican National Convention. In 1872, he was appointed prosecutor of Mercer County, Missouri. He served in the United States House of Representatives from March 4, 1873, to March 3, 1875, representing Missouri's 10th district, during the 43rd United States Congress. He lost his re-election. During his tenure, he was a member of the House Committee on Elections. He was also a member of the delegation sent by the state of Missouri for the debate over the Civil Rights Act of 1875.

After serving in Congress, Hyde continued practicing law in Princeton, also working as a banker. He was one of the founders of the Chillicothe and Des Moines City Railroad Company, which later became part of the Chicago, Rock Island and Pacific Railroad. Hyde was a founder and president of the Bank of Mercer County, and also the president of the Bank of Princeton.

== Personal life and death ==
On December 26, 1865, Hyde married Sophia Clymer at Doylestown, Pennsylvania. On August 19, 1873, he married Caroline Emily Mastick. On March 18, 1891, he married Eliza Tomlinson 'Dolly' Mastick. The patriarch of the Hyde political family, his children included Arthur, Ira Jr., and Laurance. He was a member of the Grand Army of the Republic, the Independent Order of Odd Fellows, and the Sons of the American Revolution.

He died on December 6, 1926, aged 88, in Princeton, and was buried at Princeton Cemetery. A special collection covering Hyde is held by the State Historical Society of Missouri.

== Sources ==
- Stewart, A. J. D. (1898). The History of the Bench and Bar of Missouri: With Reminiscences of the Prominent Lawyers of the Past, and a Record of the Law's Leaders of the Present. St. Louis, Missouri: The Legal Publishing Company.

U.S. House of Representatives
Preceded by District created	Member of the U.S. House of Representatives from Missouri's 10th congressional district 1873–1875	Succeeded by Rezin A. DeBolt
