= Princeton, Missouri =

City in Missouri, U.S.

- City
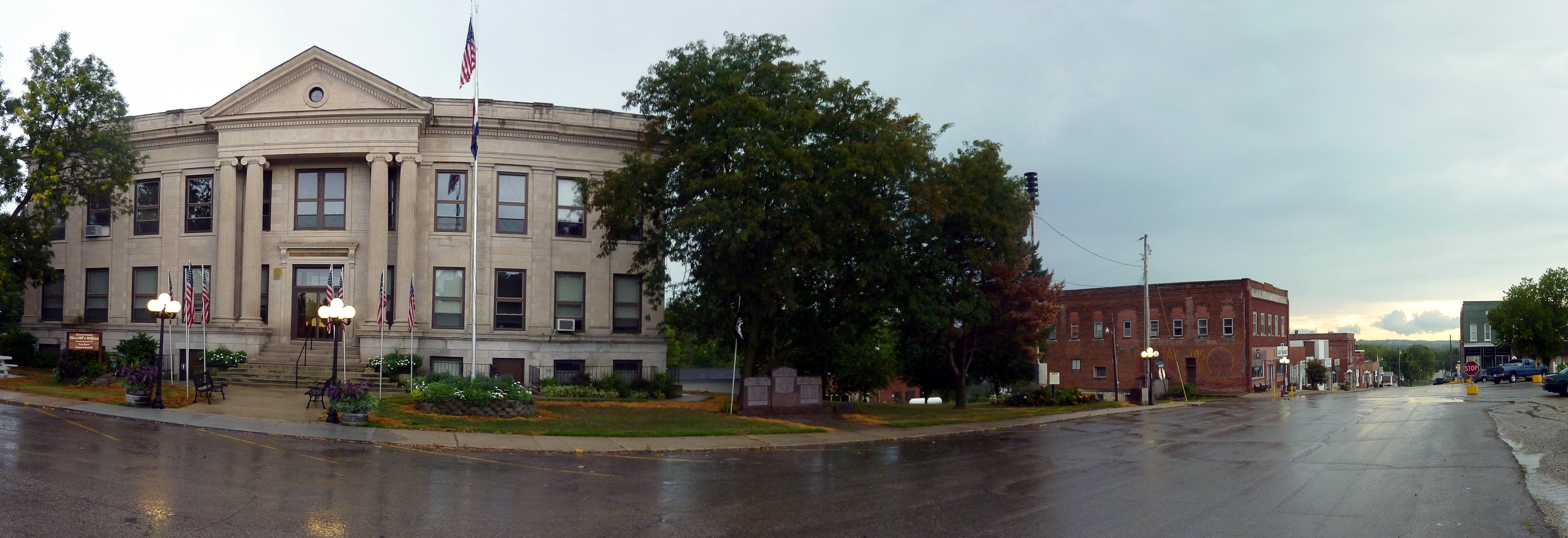
- Mercer County Courthouse and downtown

- Location in Mercer County and the state of Missouri
- Coordinates: 40°23′48″N 93°35′18″W
- Country: United States
- State: Missouri
- County: Mercer

Area
  - Total: 1.60 sq mi (4.15 km^{2})
  - Land: 1.59 sq mi (4.12 km^{2})
  - Water: 0.012 sq mi (0.03 km^{2})
- Elevation: 899 ft (274 m)

Population (2020)
  - Total: 1,007
  - Density: 633.8/sq mi (244.71/km^{2})
- Time zone: UTC-6 (Central (CST))
  - Summer (DST): UTC-5 (CDT)
- ZIP code: 64673
- Area code: 660
- FIPS code: 29-59942
- GNIS feature ID: 2396281
- Website: www.cityofprincetonmo.com

Princeton is the county seat and largest city of Mercer County, Missouri, United States. The population was 1,007 at the 2020 census, down from the 2010 census, which counted 1,166 people. Princeton was the birthplace of the famous frontierswoman Calamity Jane.

== History ==
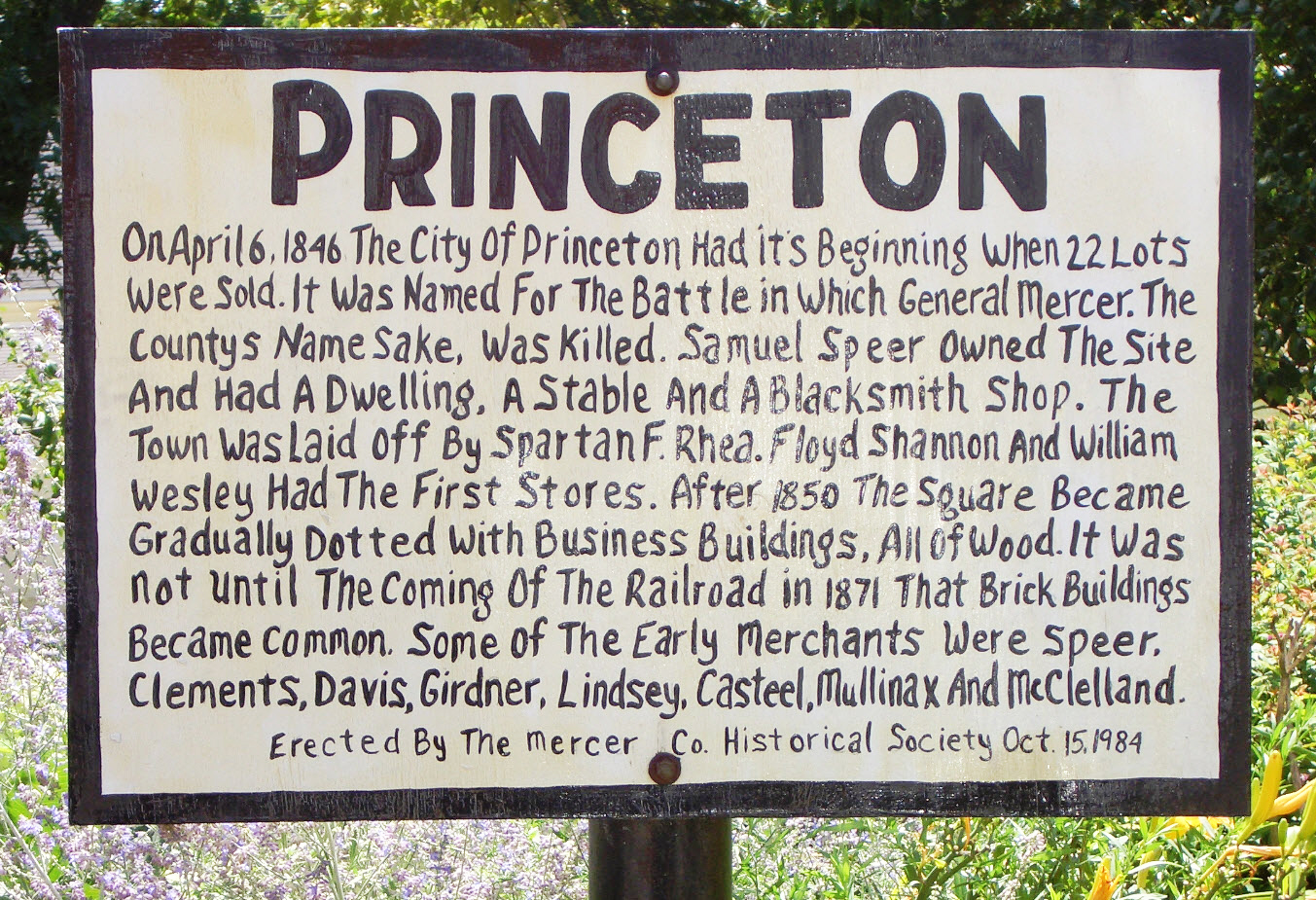
Princeton historical marker

Princeton was platted in 1846. The city was named in commemoration of the Battle of Princeton in the American Revolutionary War.

A post office has been in operation at Princeton since 1846. The town was incorporated in May 1853, but the municipal government was allowed to lapse during the Civil War until 1869.

The Herbert Cain and Corah Brantley Casteel House and Leo Ellis Post No. 22, American Legion Building are listed on the National Register of Historic Places.

== Geography ==
Princeton is in northern Missouri, in the center of Mercer County. U.S. Route 65 passes through the east side of the city, leading south 24 miles (39 km) to Trenton and north 13 miles (21 km) to Lineville, Iowa. U.S. Route 136 passes through the north side of Princeton, briefly joining US 65 but leading east 33 miles (53 km) to Unionville and southwest 28 miles (45 km) to Bethany.

According to the U.S. Census Bureau, Princeton has a total area of 1.60 square miles (4.14 km^{2}), of which 1.59 square miles (4.12 km^{2}) are land and 0.01 square miles (0.03 km^{2}), or 0.81%, are water. The Weldon River touches the western border of the city, and its tributary Wildcat Creek touches the eastern border. The city is built on a ridge separating the two water bodies. Via the Weldon River, Princeton is part of the Thompson River/Grand River watershed flowing south to the Missouri River.

=== Climate ===
Princeton has a hot-summer humid continental climate (Köppen Dfa). Summers are often hot and humid whereas winters are dry with days averaging above freezing in all months, which means sparse snow cover in spite of the cold overnight temperatures. Being far inland, the temperatures amplitude is large with an all-time range of 139 °F (77 °C).

Climate data for Princeton, Missouri (1991–2020 normals, extremes 1893–present)
Month	Jan	Feb	Mar	Apr	May	Jun	Jul	Aug	Sep	Oct	Nov	Dec	Year
Record high °F (°C)	72 (22)	77 (25)	99 (37)	96 (36)	97 (36)	106 (41)	111 (44)	110 (43)	102 (39)	95 (35)	84 (29)	73 (23)	111 (44)
Mean maximum °F (°C)	56 (13)	61 (16)	75 (24)	82 (28)	87 (31)	92 (33)	96 (36)	95 (35)	91 (33)	84 (29)	71 (22)	60 (16)	97 (36)
Mean daily maximum °F (°C)	33.6 (0.9)	38.8 (3.8)	51.3 (10.7)	62.7 (17.1)	72.0 (22.2)	81.4 (27.4)	85.8 (29.9)	84.2 (29.0)	77.2 (25.1)	65.2 (18.4)	50.6 (10.3)	38.1 (3.4)	61.7 (16.5)
Daily mean °F (°C)	24.2 (−4.3)	28.5 (−1.9)	40.1 (4.5)	50.9 (10.5)	61.2 (16.2)	71.1 (21.7)	75.6 (24.2)	73.6 (23.1)	65.3 (18.5)	53.6 (12.0)	40.2 (4.6)	29.1 (−1.6)	51.1 (10.6)
Mean daily minimum °F (°C)	14.7 (−9.6)	18.2 (−7.7)	28.9 (−1.7)	39.2 (4.0)	50.4 (10.2)	60.9 (16.1)	65.3 (18.5)	63.0 (17.2)	53.5 (11.9)	41.9 (5.5)	29.9 (−1.2)	20.1 (−6.6)	40.5 (4.7)
Mean minimum °F (°C)	−5 (−21)	−1 (−18)	10 (−12)	24 (−4)	37 (3)	49 (9)	56 (13)	53 (12)	39 (4)	27 (−3)	14 (−10)	0 (−18)	−10 (−23)
Record low °F (°C)	−26 (−32)	−28 (−33)	−25 (−32)	8 (−13)	28 (−2)	37 (3)	42 (6)	35 (2)	25 (−4)	13 (−11)	−12 (−24)	−25 (−32)	−28 (−33)
Average precipitation inches (mm)	1.10 (28)	1.23 (31)	2.23 (57)	4.24 (108)	5.05 (128)	5.60 (142)	3.86 (98)	4.25 (108)	3.81 (97)	3.29 (84)	1.90 (48)	1.42 (36)	37.98 (965)
Average extreme snow depth inches (cm)	3 (7.6)	3 (7.6)	1 (2.5)	0 (0)	0 (0)	0 (0)	0 (0)	0 (0)	0 (0)	0 (0)	0 (0)	1 (2.5)	4 (10)
Average precipitation days (≥ 0.01 in)	5.8	5.8	7.3	9.8	12.3	10.5	8.5	8.6	7.4	7.9	6.1	5.1	95.1
Source: NOAA

== Demographics ==
Historical population
Census	Pop.	Note	%±
1860	249		—
1870	389		56.2%
1880	1,240		218.8%
1890	1,410		13.7%
1900	1,575		11.7%
1910	1,385		−12.1%
1920	1,576		13.8%
1930	1,509		−4.3%
1940	1,584		5.0%
1950	1,506		−4.9%
1960	1,443		−4.2%
1970	1,328		−8.0%
1980	1,264		−4.8%
1990	1,021		−19.2%
2000	1,047		2.5%
2010	1,166		11.4%
2020	1,007		−13.6%
U.S. Decennial Census

=== 2010 census ===
As of the census of 2010, there were 1,166 people, 525 households, and 282 families living in the city. The population density was 733.3 inhabitants per square mile (283.1/km^{2}). There were 632 housing units at an average density of 397.5 per square mile (153.5/km^{2}). The racial makeup of the city was 98.9% White, 0.3% African American, 0.2% Native American, 0.2% Asian, 0.3% from other races, and 0.2% from two or more races. Hispanic or Latino of any race were 0.8% of the population.

There were 525 households, of which 28.2% had children under the age of 18 living with them, 40.2% were married couples living together, 10.1% had a female householder with no husband present, 3.4% had a male householder with no wife present, and 46.3% were non-families. 41.9% of all households were made up of individuals, and 22.4% had someone living alone who was 65 years of age or older. The average household size was 2.12 and the average family size was 2.91.

The median age in the city was 40.3 years. 24.4% of residents were under the age of 18; 6.6% were between the ages of 18 and 24; 23.4% were from 25 to 44; 20.8% were from 45 to 64; and 24.6% were 65 years of age or older. The gender makeup of the city was 47.7% male and 52.3% female.

=== 2000 census ===
As of the census of 2000, there were 1,047 people, 499 households, and 271 families living in the city. The population density was 660.5 inhabitants per square mile (255.0/km^{2}). There were 566 housing units at an average density of 357.0 per square mile (137.8/km^{2}). The racial makeup of the city was 98.85% White, 0.10% African American, 0.67% Native American, and 0.38% from two or more races. Hispanic or Latino of any race were 0.29% of the population.

There were 499 households, out of which 26.1% had children under the age of 18 living with them, 41.1% were married couples living together, 8.8% had a female householder with no husband present, and 45.5% were non-families. 42.9% of all households were made up of individuals, and 30.1% had someone living alone who was 65 years of age or older. The average household size was 2.05 and the average family size was 2.79.

In the city, the population was spread out, with 22.7% under the age of 18, 7.3% from 18 to 24, 21.7% from 25 to 44, 19.9% from 45 to 64, and 28.5% who were 65 years of age or older. The median age was 44 years. For every 100 females there were 77.8 males. For every 100 females age 18 and over, there were 75.1 males.

The median income for a household in the city was $27,059, and the median income for a family was $39,125. Males had a median income of $29,583 versus $19,327 for females. The per capita income for the city was $15,485. About 14.3% of families and 17.3% of the population were below the poverty line, including 22.9% of those under age 18 and 15.8% of those age 65 or over.

== Education ==
Princeton is home to the Princeton R-V School District which consists of an elementary school (K-6), a junior high school (grades 7–8) and Princeton High School (grades 9-12).

Princeton has a public library, the Mercer County Library.

== Notable people ==
- Russ Derry, MLB baseball player
- Arthur M. Hyde, governor and U.S. Secretary of Agriculture
- Ira B. Hyde, U.S. congressman 1873–1875
- Laurance M. Hyde, Missouri Supreme Court judge
- Calamity Jane, also known as Martha Jane Cannary, frontierswoman
- Mervin Kelly, physicist at Bell Labs
- Christopher Langan, a man who has been described as "the smartest man in America" by some journalists
- Minnetta Theodora Taylor (1860-1911), author, poet, polyglot, clubwoman, suffragist

== See also ==
- List of cities in Missouri
