= 1920 Missouri gubernatorial election =

- November 2, 1920
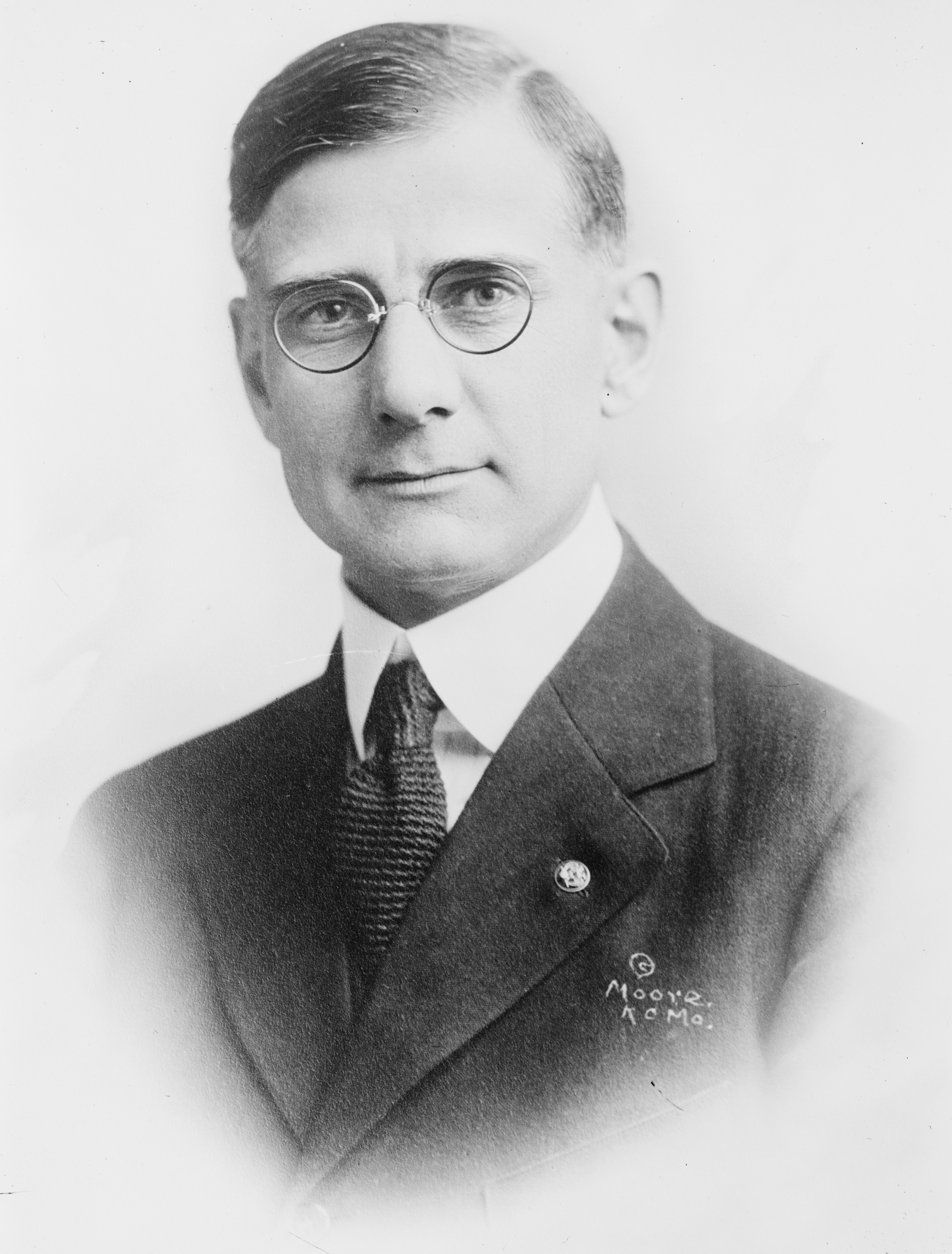

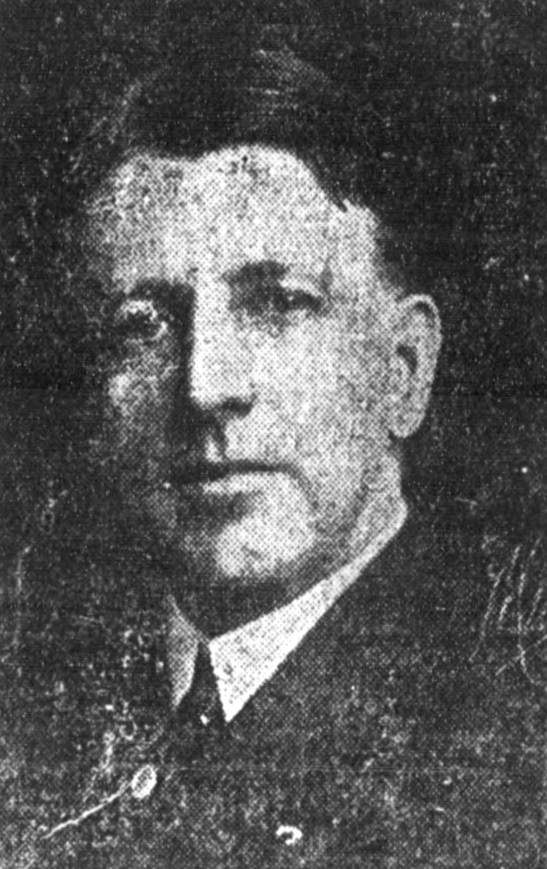
Nominee	Arthur M. Hyde	John Atkinson
Party	Republican	Democratic
Popular vote	722,020	580,726
Percentage	54.25%	43.64%
- County results Hyde: 40–50% 50–60% 60–70% 70–80% 80–90% Atkinson: 40–50% 50–60% 60–70% 70–80% 80–90%
Governor before election
Frederick D. Gardner
Democratic
Elected Governor
Arthur M. Hyde
Republican

The 1920 Missouri gubernatorial election was held on November 2, 1920, and resulted in a victory for the Republican nominee, Arthur M. Hyde, over the Democratic nominee, John M. Atkinson, and several other candidates representing minor parties.

This was the first Missouri gubernatorial election in which more than one million votes were cast, mostly a result of the increased turnout compared to previous elections, due to the 1919 passage and August 18, 1920, ratification of the Nineteenth Amendment to the U.S. Constitution, giving women the right to vote.

== Results ==
1920 gubernatorial election, Missouri
Party	Candidate	Votes	%	±%
Republican	Arthur M. Hyde	722,020	54.25	+5.89
Democratic	John M. Atkinson	580,726	43.64	−5.01
Socialist	Marvin M. Aldrich	19,489	1.46	−0.39
Prohibition	Herman Preston Faris	3,974	0.30	−0.21
Farmer-Worker	Vaughn Hickman	3,003	0.23	+0.23
Socialist Labor	Edward G. Middlecoff	1,620	0.12	±0.00
Majority		141,294	10.62	+10.33
Turnout		1,330,832	39.10	+15.23
Republican gain from Democratic		Swing		
