= 1916 Missouri gubernatorial election =

- November 7, 1916
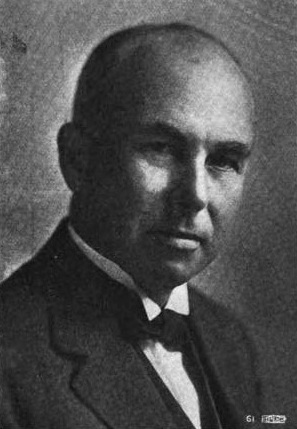

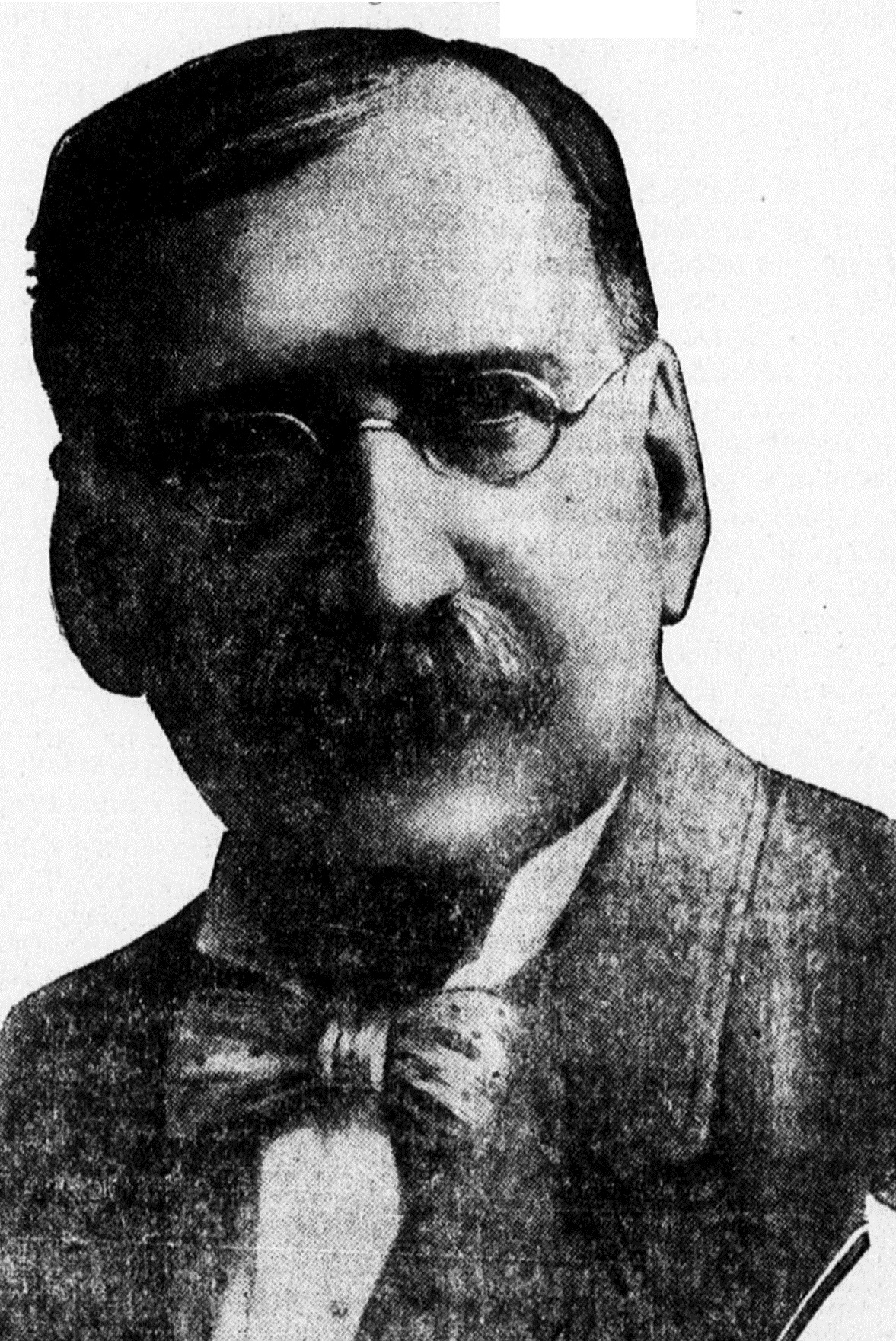
Nominee	Frederick D. Gardner	Henry Lamm
Party	Democratic	Republican
Popular vote	382,355	380,092
Percentage	48.65%	48.36%
- County results Gardner: 40–50% 50–60% 60–70% 70–80% 80–90% Lamm: 40–50% 50–60% 60–70% 70–80% 80–90%
Governor before election
Elliot Woolfolk Major
Democratic
Elected Governor
Frederick D. Gardner
Democratic

The 1916 Missouri gubernatorial election was held on November 7, 1916, and resulted in a narrow victory for the Democratic nominee, St. Louis businessman Frederick D. Gardner, over the Republican candidate, Chief Justice of the Supreme Court of Missouri Henry Lamm, and candidates representing the Socialist, Progressive, Prohibition, and Socialist Labor parties. To date, it is the closest gubernatorial election in Missouri history. Gardner defeated Secretary of State Cornelius Roach, Attorney General John Tull Barker, and Lieutenant Governor William Rock Painter for his party's nomination.

== Results ==
1916 gubernatorial election, Missouri
Party	Candidate	Votes	%	±%
Democratic	Frederick D. Gardner	382,355	48.65	+0.45
Republican	Henry Lamm	380,092	48.36	+17.21
Socialist	William J. Adames	14,555	1.85	−2.18
Progressive	Joseph P. Fontron	4,041	0.51	−15.11
Prohibition	William H. Yount	4,009	0.51	−0.24
Socialist Labor	Charles Rogers	946	0.12	−0.15
Majority		2,263	0.29	−16.76
Turnout		785,998	23.87	
Democratic hold		Swing		
