= Arthur M. Hyde =

American politician (1877–1947)

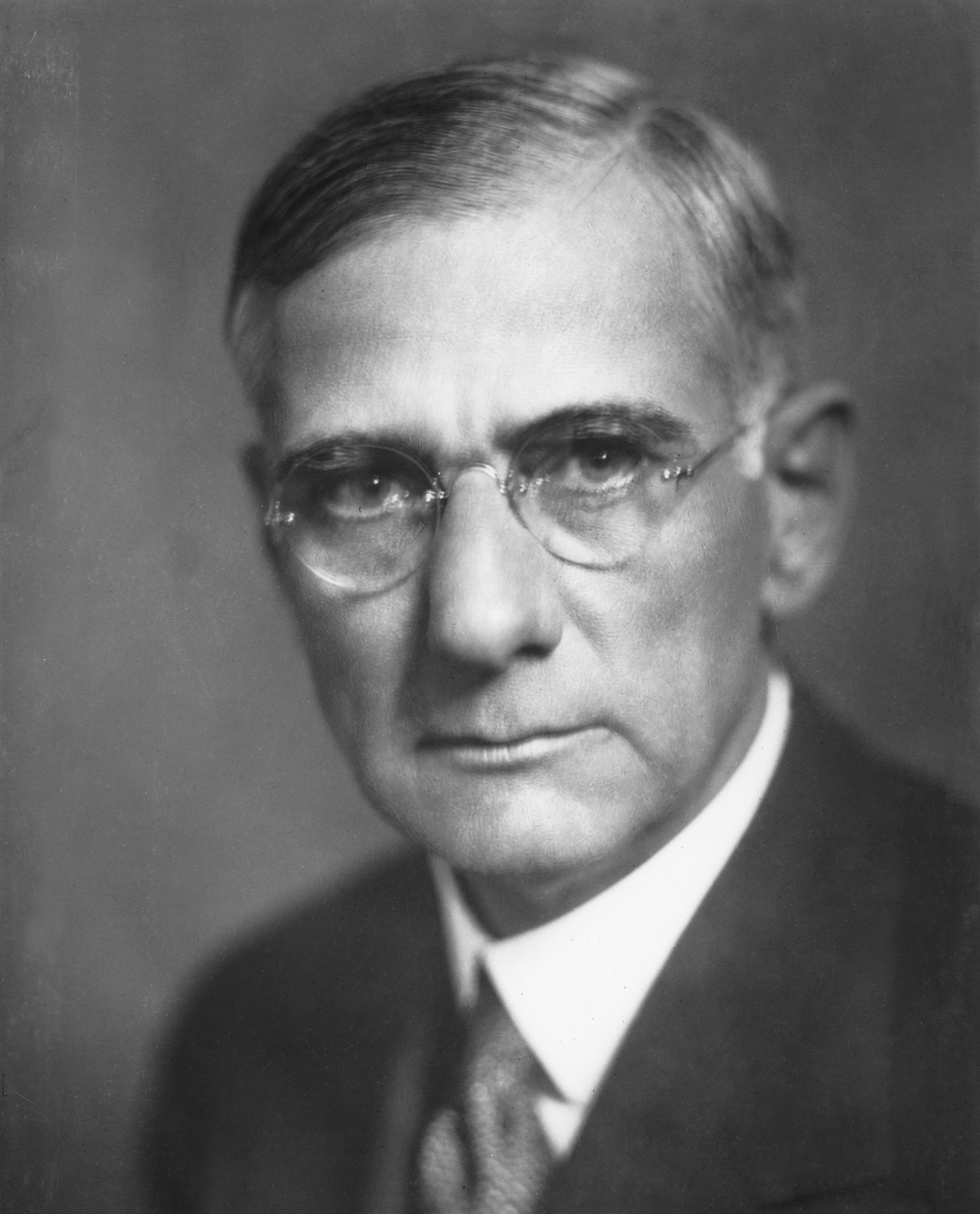
- Hyde, c. 1929–1933

10th United States Secretary of Agriculture
- In office March 6, 1929 – March 4, 1933
- President: Herbert Hoover
- Preceded by: William Jardine
- Succeeded by: Henry A. Wallace

35th Governor of Missouri
- In office January 10, 1921 – January 12, 1925
- Lieutenant: Hiram Lloyd
- Preceded by: Frederick D. Gardner
- Succeeded by: Sam Baker

Mayor of Princeton
- In office 1908–1912

Personal details
- Born: Arthur Mastick Hyde; July 12, 1877 Princeton, Missouri, U.S.
- Died: October 17, 1947 (aged 70) New York City, New York, U.S.
- Party: Republican
- Other political affiliations: Progressive (1912)
- Spouse: Hortense Cullers
- Children: 1
- Education: University of Michigan, Ann Arbor (BA); University of Iowa (LLB)

Arthur Mastick Hyde (July 12, 1877 – October 17, 1947) was an American Republican politician, who served as the 35th governor of Missouri from 1921 to 1925, and as the United States secretary of agriculture for President Herbert Hoover from 1929 to 1933.

== Biography ==
Hyde was born on July 12, 1877, in Princeton, Missouri, the son of Caroline Emity Mastick and Ira B. Hyde. Several of Arthur's family members were involved in politics; his father, Ira B. Hyde, was the U.S. representative from Missouri. His brother, Laurance M. Hyde, would become a Chief Justice of the Supreme Court of Missouri. He graduated from the University of Michigan in 1899. While at the University of Michigan, he joined the Delta Upsilon fraternity. In 1900, he completed his law degree at the University of Iowa. Hyde began practicing law with his father in Princeton. In 1911, he opened a Buick dealership.

On October 19, 1904, Hyde married Hortense Clara Cullers. They had one daughter, Caroline C. Hyde. He was elected as mayor of Princeton in 1908. He served two terms, from 1908 to 1912. In 1912, Hyde unsuccessfully ran for Missouri Attorney General as a member of the Progressive Party. In 1915, he moved to Trenton, Missouri, and continued his work as a lawyer and automobile dealership owner. Hyde joined the Republican Party and spoke across Missouri for fund-raising campaigns.

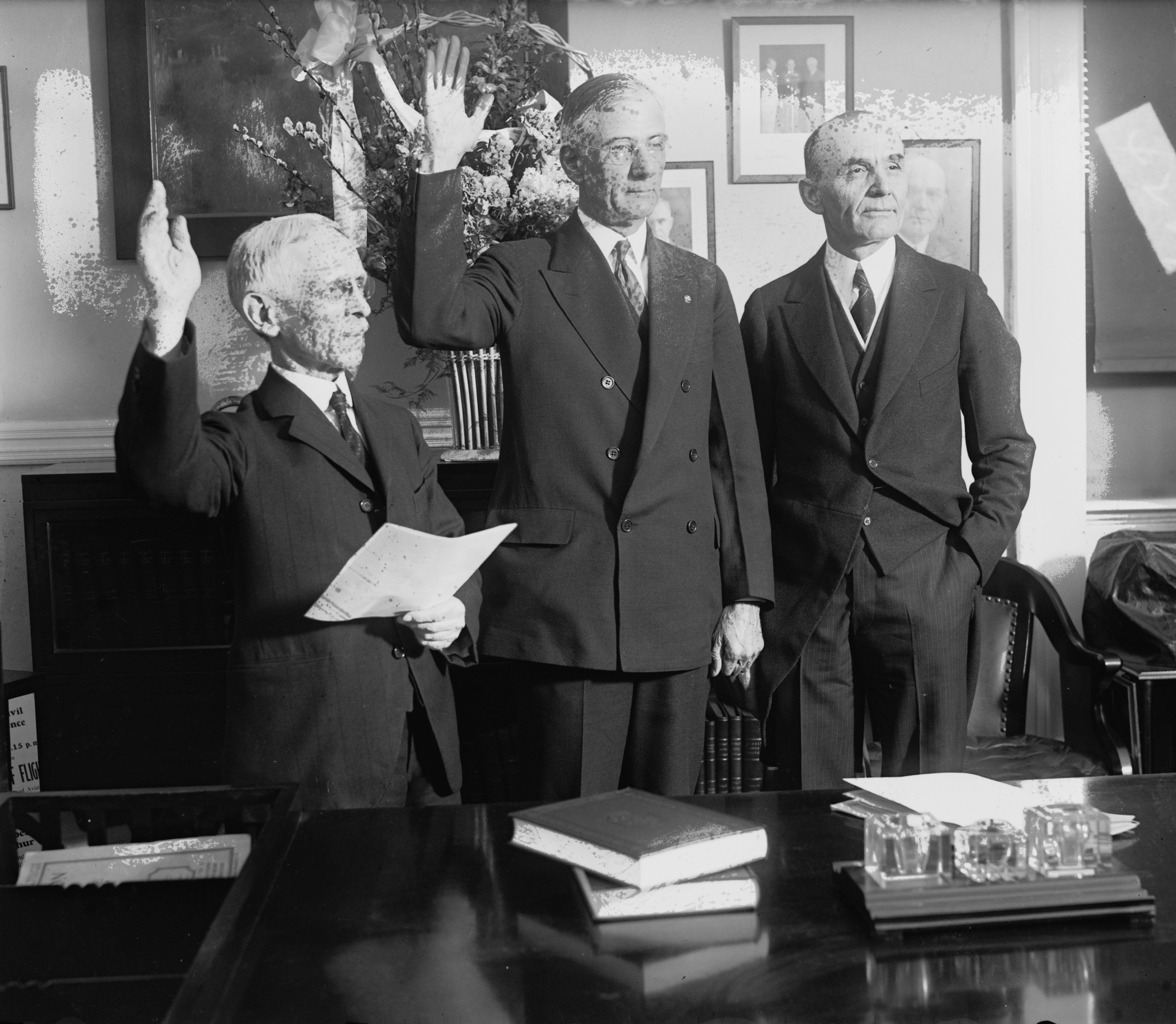
Hyde sworn into office as secretary of agriculture, next to his predecessor William M. Jardine (right).

Hyde was elected as Governor of Missouri in the 1920 election, and served one term from 1921 to 1925. During his first month as governor, Hyde recommended extensive reorganization of state government by regrouping responsibilities into a few departments. Although challenged by Democratic Party bosses, his administration made advances in public education, roads, state parks, conservation, law enforcement, and equitable taxes. Also during his time as governor, women were authorized to hold state office.

Following his term as governor, Hyde returned to law practice in Kansas City and Trenton. He then served as the secretary of agriculture under President Herbert Hoover from March 6, 1929, until March 4, 1933. During his tenure, farm prices declined, stock prices crashed, and the Great Depression began.

After his cabinet appointment, Hyde continued his work with the Methodist Church and the Republican Party. In 1935, he organized and spoke at the Conference of Methodist Laymen. He spoke for Republican candidates nationally and was the keynote speaker for the Missouri State Republican Convention in 1940.

Arthur Hyde died in New York City, after cancer surgery on October 17, 1947, at age 70. He is buried at the Odd Fellows Cemetery in Trenton, Missouri.

Party political offices
Preceded by Henry Lamm	Republican nominee for Governor of Missouri; 1920	Succeeded by Sam Baker
Political offices
Preceded by Frederick D. Gardner	Governor of Missouri; 1921–1925	Succeeded by Sam Baker
Preceded by William Jardine	United States Secretary of Agriculture; 1929–1933	Succeeded by Henry A. Wallace
