= Henry Lamm =

American judge (1846–1926)

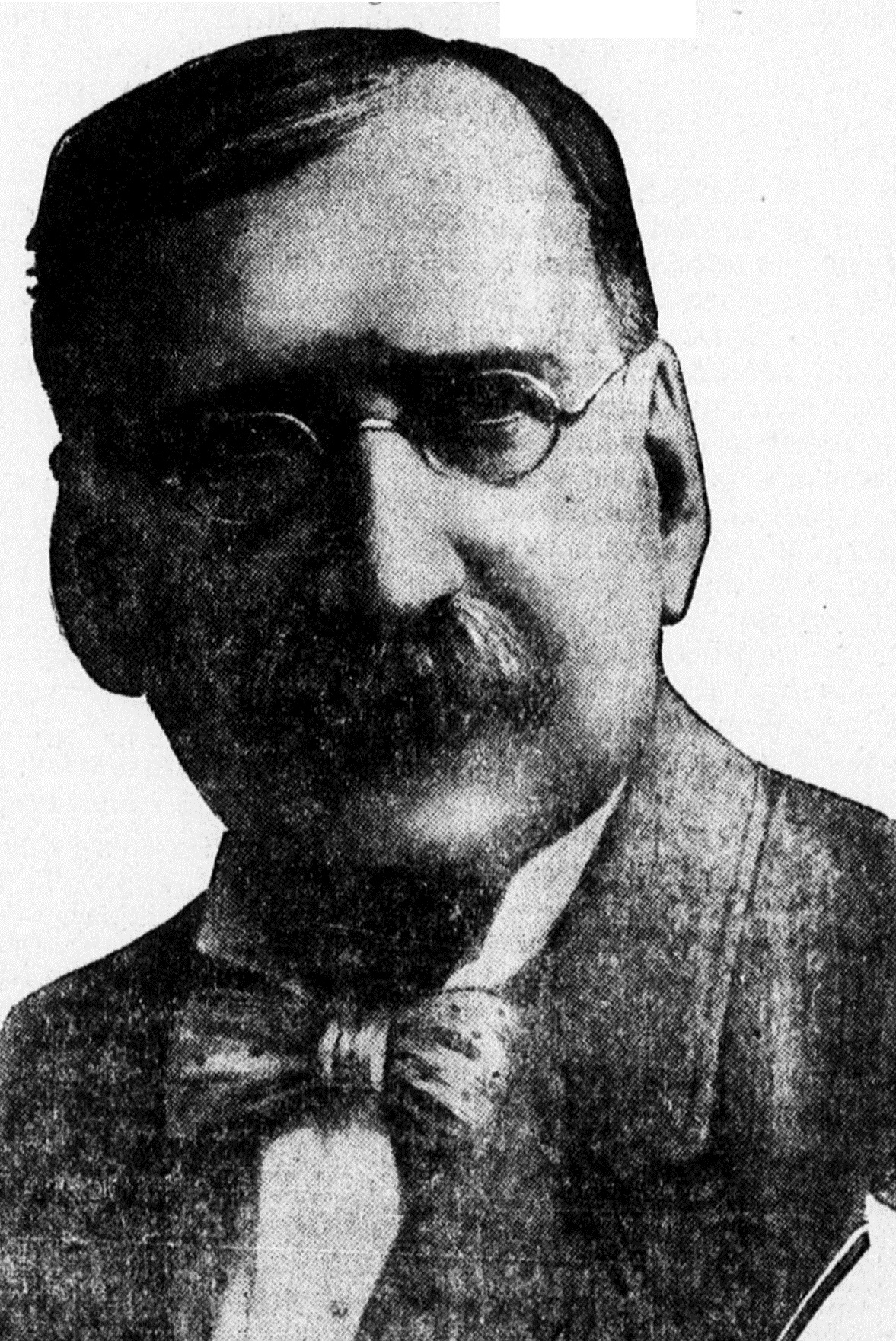
Henry Lamm (1916)

Henry Lamm (December 3, 1846 – May 23, 1926) was a justice of the Supreme Court of Missouri from 1905 to 1914.

== Early life, education, and career ==
Born in Burbank, Wayne County, Ohio, Lamm attended the common school of Burbank and Western College in Iowa before receiving a degree from the University of Michigan at Ann Arbor in 1869. He then moved to Sedalia, Missouri, where he remain for his lifetime. He taught school while reading law, and obtained employment as a deputy in the clerk's office of Pettis County, Missouri. When the county clerk resigned a few months later, Lamm was appointed to serve the remainder of that term.

== Judicial service and gubernatorial campaign ==
In 1904, he received the Republican nomination for a seat on the state supreme court, thereafter winning the general election. Lamm announced his retirement from the court on December 29, 1914, shortly after his 68th birthday.

He was the Republican candidate for governor in the 1916 campaign and though he ran ahead of the ticket, he was defeated by Frederick D. Gardner in a Democratic landslide election. Lamm resisted efforts to persuade him to run for the office again in 1920, instead backing Arthur M. Hyde, who won the nomination and the election.

== Personal life and death ==
On June 18, 1874, Lamm married Grace Adela Rose, with whom he had six children. Lamm died in Sedalia, after a period of illness, at the age of 79.

Political offices
Preceded by Waltour Moss Robinson	Justice of the Missouri Supreme Court; 1905–1914	Succeeded by James T. Blair Jr.
