= Frederick D. Gardner =

American businessman and politician (1869–1933)

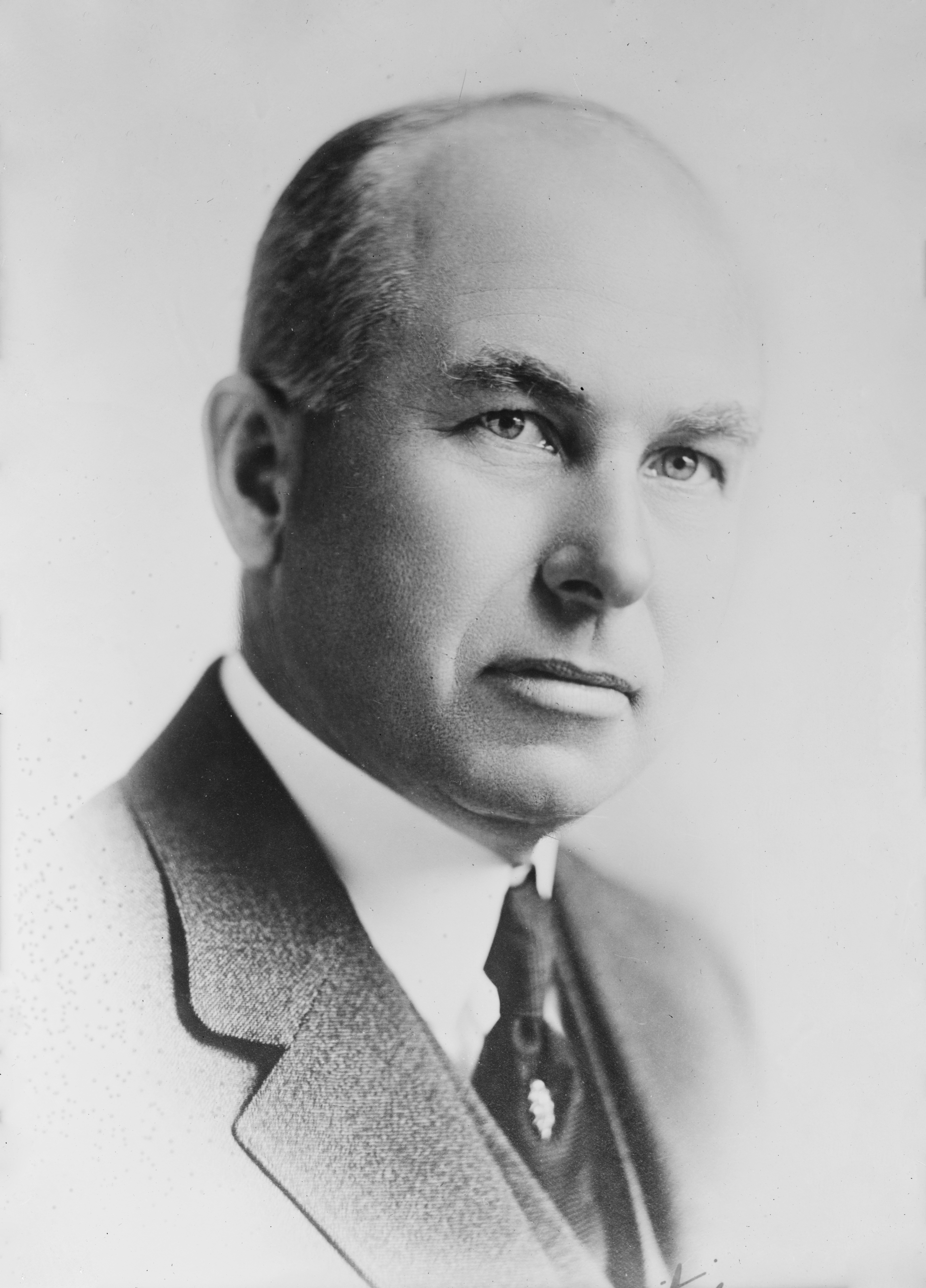
- Frederick Dozier Gardner circa 1915

34th Governor of Missouri
- In office January 8, 1917 – January 10, 1921
- Lieutenant: Wallace Crossley
- Preceded by: Elliot Woolfolk Major
- Succeeded by: Arthur M. Hyde

Personal details
- Born: November 6, 1869 Hickman, Kentucky
- Died: December 18, 1933 (aged 64) St. Louis, Missouri
- Party: Democratic
- Spouse: Jeannette Vosburgh
- Children: four
- Profession: funeral director and supply manufacturer, businessman

Frederick Dozier Gardner (November 6, 1869 – December 18, 1933), an American businessman and politician from St. Louis, Missouri, served as the 34th governor of Missouri from 1917 to 1921.

== Political career ==
Gardner was born in Hickman, Kentucky; his father was William H. Gardner. He rose to prominence in St. Louis. The only political office he ever sought was a single term as governor, and he narrowly won the election of 1916. However, he did later attend national conventions of the Democratic Party.

As Governor of Missouri he oversaw the elimination of the state's debt; it was $2,250,000 when he took office, but the state had over $3,500,000 in the treasury at the end of his term.

According to one observer, Gardner was a "progressive-minded governor who kept a good eye on the balance sheet."

=== Businessman ===
In addition to his political career, Gardner spent 47 years in the funeral industry both as a funeral director and supplier, starting his career as an office boy. He worked for the Ellis Undertaking Co., M. Hermann & Son Livery & Undertaking, and the Southern Undertaking Co., all located in St. Louis. He eventually owned the St. Louis Coffin Co., and served as its president. He was also vice president of Gardner Motor Co. which operated in St. Louis from 1920 to 1932 and manufactured hearses and ambulances. He also operated casket manufacturing plants in Memphis, Tennessee; Texarkana, Arkansas; and Dallas, Texas.

=== Personal life and death ===
He married Jeannette Vosburgh in 1894 and they had four children: William King, Dozier, Lee, and Janet Gardner. He was also a Freemason belonging to the historic Tuscan Lodge #360 Masonic Temple. He died December 18, 1933, in St. Louis, from an infection of the jaw. He was buried in the Bellefontaine Cemetery there with full Masonic rites.

Party political offices
| Preceded by Elliot Woolfolk Major | Democratic nominee for Governor of Missouri; 1916 | Succeeded by John Atkinson |
Political offices
| Preceded by Elliot Woolfolk Major | Governor of Missouri; 1917-1921 | Succeeded by Arthur M. Hyde |
