= Interstate 35 in Missouri =

Section of Interstate Highway in Missouri, United States

Interstate 35
- I-35 highlighted in red, I-35 Bus. in green

Route information
- Maintained by MoDOT
- Length: 114.74 mi (184.66 km)
- NHS: Entire route

Major junctions
- South end: I-35 at the Kansas state line in Kansas City
- I-670 in Kansas City; I-70 / US 169 in Kansas City; US 40 / US 71 in Kansas City; I-29 / US 71 in Kansas City; I-435 / Route 110 (CKC) in Claycomo; US 36 / Route 110 (CKC) in Cameron; US 136 in Bethany
- North end: I-35 at the Iowa state line near Eagleville

Location
- Country: United States
- State: Missouri
- Counties: Jackson, Clay, Clinton, DeKalb, Caldwell, Daviess, Harrison

Highway system
- Interstate Highway System; Main; Auxiliary; Suffixed; Business; Future; Missouri State Highway System; Interstate; US; State; Supplemental
← Route 34	→ US 36

Interstate 35 (I-35) is an Interstate Highway that stretches from Laredo, Texas, in the south to Duluth in the north. The portion of it through Missouri travels nearly 115 miles (185 km) from just south of Kansas City, through the Downtown Loop, and across the Missouri River before leaving the downtown area. North of Kansas City, the highway travels north-northeast toward the Iowa state line near Eagleville, paralleling U.S. Route 69 (US 69).

== Route description ==
=== Kansas border to Liberty ===
I-35 enters Missouri two miles (3.2 km) southwest of Downtown Kansas City as a six-lane highway. After merging with Southwest Trafficway (exit 1A) and Broadway Boulevard (exit 1B), it becomes an eight-lane freeway and continues north to downtown, where it serves as the west and north legs of the Downtown Loop. Along the loop's northern edge, I-35 runs concurrent with I-70 immediately west of Broadway Boulevard and carries six lanes of traffic with a speed limit of 45 mph (72 km/h). After leaving the loop, I-29 begins, and I-35 runs concurrent with it. Both Interstates, together, cross the Missouri River on the Christopher S. Bond Bridge.

After crossing the Missouri River, I-35 enters an industrial district of North Kansas City where it travels northward towards Kansas City proper. Then, I-29 and I-35 diverge in the Colonial Square neighborhood of Kansas City, going west and east, respectively. I-35 then turns northwest and intersects US 69 for the first of seven times in Missouri. I-35 continues northeast and junctions with I-435 in Claycomo, which is also the start of the Chicago-Kansas City Expressway, then begins to run concurrent with US 69 in Pleasant Valley before it forms the northwest segment of the Liberty Triangle in Liberty.

=== Liberty to Iowa border ===
While heading northeasterly, I-35 exits Liberty and diverges from US 69 and makes a north-northeast course to Kearney. It continues in this direction and passes Lake Arrowhead and Wallace State Park before reaching Cameron. In Cameron, the interstate has a business route that begins at exit 52 and rejoins the highway at exit 54 at its juncture with US 36. Also, this is where the Chicago-Kansas City Expressway diverges and continues on US 36.

I-35 continues north from Cameron, intersecting US 69 (exit 61) as it crosses from the west- to the eastside of the highway before intersecting Route 6 (exit 64), providing access to Weatherby to the west of I-35. The Route 6 exit also provides access to the Interstate 35 Speedway, located in Winston. North of the interchange with Route 6, US 69 intersects I-35 again (exit 68) and, for the remainder of its route, stays to the west of I-35. Between Route DD (exit 72), providing local access to farmland, and Route C (exit 78), providing access to Pattonsburg, I-35 crosses the Grand River west of the Elam Bend Conservation Area. A final interchange with Route B and Route N (exit 80), providing access to Coffey, mark the last exit inside of Daviess County, and I-35 enters Harrison County.

Route AA and Route H (exit 84), which provides access to Gilman City to the east, are the first interchange with in Harrison County as I-35 continues northeasterly through northern Missouri, intersecting Route 13 (exit 88) south of the county seat, Bethany. Two interchanges provide access to Bethany, one with US 136 (exit 92) and one with U.S. Route 69 Spur (US 69 Spur, exit 93). Route A (exit 99) provides access to the town of Ridgeway to the east of the Interstate, and Route N (exit 106) further north provides access to Eagleville to the west and Blythedale to the east. Rest stops for both directions of travel are north of Route N, as well as a welcome center for motorists traveling southbound before intersecting US 69 (100th Street, exit 114) before crossing into Iowa.

=== Transit ===
Jefferson Lines provides intercity bus service along the length of I-35 in Missouri serving three communities along the route. The Kansas City Bus Station serves as a major transfer point along the I-35 route.

== Exit list ==
County	Location	mi	km	Exit	Destinations	Notes
Missouri–Kansas line		0.000	0.000		I-35 south – Wichita	Continuation into Kansas
Missouri–Kansas line		0.000	0.000	235	Cambridge Circle	Westbound exit and eastbound entrance extend into Missouri; exit number based on Kansas mileage
Jackson	Kansas City	0.795	1.279	1A	Southwest Trafficway	Southbound left exit and northbound entrance
Jackson	Kansas City	1.038	1.670	1B	27th Street / Broadway Boulevard	Southbound left exit and northbound entrance
Jackson	Kansas City	1.343	2.161	1C	W. Pennway / Southwest Boulevard to 22nd Street	Northbound exit and southbound entrance. Access to UMKC Medical School, Truman Medical Center-Hospital Hill, Crown Center, Liberty Memorial, Union Station, Kauffman Center for the Performing Arts, American Royal Center, and Hy-Vee Arena.
Jackson	Kansas City	1.343	2.161	1D	20th Street to 22nd Street VIA Grand Boulevard or McGee Street	Southbound exit only
Jackson	Kansas City	1.857	2.989	2U	Broadway Boulevard	Northbound exit and southbound entrance
Jackson	Kansas City	2.025	3.259	2U	I-70 east – St. Louis	I-670 exit 2T
Jackson	Kansas City	2.053	3.304	2U	I-670 west / I-70 west – Topeka	Northbound exit and southbound entrance; I-670 exit 2T
Jackson	Kansas City	2.080	3.347	2V	14th Street – Downtown Kansas City	Northbound exit and southbound entrance
Jackson	Kansas City	2.232	3.592	2W	12th Street	
Jackson	Kansas City	2.866– 3.028	4.612– 4.873	2X	I-70 west / US 24 west / US 40 west / US 169 south	Northbound left exit and southbound entrance
Jackson	Kansas City	2.866– 3.028	4.612– 4.873	2Y	US 169 north	Northbound exit and southbound entrance
Jackson	Kansas City	2.866– 3.028	4.612– 4.873	2Z	Broadway Boulevard	Northbound exit and southbound entrance
Jackson	Kansas City	2.866– 3.028	4.612– 4.873	—	I-70 west / US 24 west / US 40 west / US 169 south	Southern end of I-70/US 24/US 40 overlap; southbound left exit and northbound left entrance; I-70 exit 2A
Jackson	Kansas City	2.866– 3.028	4.612– 4.873	2C	US 169 north (Broadway Boulevard)	Southbound exit and northbound entrance
Jackson	Kansas City	3.211	5.168	2D	Main Street / Delaware Street / Wyandotte Street	Signed as "Main St." only northbound
Jackson	Kansas City	3.583	5.766	2E	Route 9 north / Oak Street	No southbound exit
Jackson	Kansas City	3.476	5.594	2F	Oak Street / Grand Avenue / Walnut Street	Northbound access via exit 2E; no northbound entrance; no access to this exit from I-70 westbound
Jackson	Kansas City	3.912– 4.068	6.296– 6.547	—	I-70 east / US 24 east / US 40 east / US 71 south – St. Louis, Joplin I-29 begins	Northbound exit and southbound left entrance; northern end of I-70/US 24/US 40 overlap; southern end of I-29 overlap; I-70 exit 2G–H
Jackson	Kansas City	3.912– 4.068	6.296– 6.547	2H	Admiral Boulevard Route 9 north – North Kansas City US 24 Bus. (Independence Avenue)	Former northern end of US 24 overlap; northbound exit and southbound entrance
Jackson	Kansas City	3.912– 4.068	6.296– 6.547	3	I-70 east / US 24 east / US 40 west / US 71 south – St. Louis, Joplin; 11th Street — Downtown	Southern end of US 71 overlap; southbound left exit and northbound entrance; I-70 exit 2G; 11th Street Exit 2J; southbound exit and northbound entrance
Jackson	Kansas City	4.442	7.149	4A	The Paseo (Independence Avenue) to US 24 Bus.	Southbound left exit and northbound entrance
Jackson	Kansas City	4.814	7.747	4B	Front Street / Grand Boulevard	Signed as exit 4 northbound
Missouri River		5.165– 5.447	8.312– 8.766	Christopher S. Bond Bridge		
Clay	North Kansas City	5.447– 5.499	8.766– 8.850	5A	Bedford Street	Northbound exit and southbound entrance
Clay	North Kansas City	5.447– 5.499	8.766– 8.850	5	Levee Road	Southbound exit and northbound entrance
Clay	North Kansas City	6.057	9.748	5B	16th Avenue	Northbound exit and southbound entrance
Clay	North Kansas City	6.629	10.668	6	Route 210 east (Armour Road)	Access to North Kansas City Hospital
Clay	Kansas City	8.181	13.166	8A	Parvin Road	
Clay	Kansas City	8.496	13.673	8B	I-29 north / US 71 north – St. Joseph, Kansas City International Airport	Northern end of I-29/US 71 overlap; left exit northbound
Clay	Kansas City	9.018	14.513	8C	Route 1 (Antioch Road)	
Clay	Kansas City	9.611	15.467	9	Route 269 south (Choteau Trafficway)	
Clay	Kansas City	10.612	17.078	10	North Brighton Avenue	Northbound exit and southbound entrance
Clay	Kansas City	11.254	18.112	11	US 69 (Vivion Road) – Claycomo	
Clay	Claycomo	12.917	20.788	12A	I-435 south – St. Louis, Joplin Route 110 (CKC) begins	I-435 exit 52B; southern terminus of Route 110 (CKC); signed as exit 12 southbound
Clay	Claycomo	13.154	21.169	12B	I-435 north – St. Joseph, Kansas City International Airport	I-435 exit 52B; northbound exit and southbound entrance
Clay	Pleasant Valley	14.082	22.663	13	US 69 south to I-435 north – Pleasant Valley, Liberty, Glenaire	Southern end of US 69 overlap; signed as exit 14 southbound
Clay	Liberty	16.443	26.462	16	Route 152 – Liberty, Kansas City International Airport	
Clay	Liberty	17.942	28.875	17	Route 291 to I-435 – Liberty, Kansas City International Airport	
Clay	Liberty	20.348	32.747	20	US 69 – Excelsior Springs, Lawson	Northern end of US 69 overlap
Clay	Kearney	24.742	39.818	25	19th Street	Diverging diamond interchange
Clay	Kearney	26.320	42.358	26	Route 92 – Excelsior Springs, Kearney	
Clinton	Holt	33.222	53.466	33	Route PP – Holt, Lawson	
Clinton		40.128	64.580	40	Route 116 – Polo, Lathrop	
Clinton		48.329	77.778	48	US 69 – Cameron, Lawson	
Clinton	Cameron	52.822	85.009	52	I-35 BL north / Route BB – Cameron	
DeKalb	Cameron	54.306	87.397	54	US 36 / I-35 BL south / Route 110 (CKC) east – Cameron, Hamilton	Northern end of Route 110 (CKC) overlap
Caldwell	No major junctions					
Daviess		61.606	99.145	61	US 69 – Winston, Jamesport	
Daviess		65.076	104.730	64	Route 6 – Gallatin, Maysville	
Daviess		68.639	110.464	68	US 69 – Altamont	
Daviess		72.546	116.751	72	Route DD – Pattonsburg	
Daviess		78.132	125.741	78	Route C – Pattonsburg	
Daviess		80.481	129.522	80	Route B / Route N – Coffey	
Harrison		84.440	135.893	84	Route AA / Route H – Gilman City	
Harrison		88.465	142.371	88	Route 13 – Bethany, Gallatin	
Harrison	Bethany	92.296	148.536	92	US 136 – Princeton, Bethany	
Harrison	Bethany	93.272	150.107	93	US 69 Spur – Bethany	
Harrison		99.860	160.709	99	Route A – Ridgeway	
Harrison	Eagleville	106.346	171.147	106	Route N – Eagleville, Blythedale	
Missouri–Iowa line		114.217– 114.74	183.814– 184.66	114	To US 69 – Lamoni	Street sits on state line; northbound on-ramp is in Iowa
Missouri–Iowa line		114.217– 114.74	183.814– 184.66		I-35 north – Des Moines	Continuation into Iowa
1.000 mi = 1.609 km; 1.000 km = 0.621 mi: Concurrency terminus; Incomplete access

== Related routes ==
I-435 is a beltway that encircles much of Kansas City within the states of Kansas and Missouri. I-635 is a connector highway between I-35 in Overland Park, Kansas, and I-29 in Kansas City, Missouri, approximately 12 miles (19 km) long. It is mostly in the US state of Kansas, servicing the city of Kansas City, Kansas, but extends into Kansas City, Missouri, as well. The freeway's southern terminus is at a stack interchange with I-35. South of this, the mainline becomes an expressway carrying US 69.

=== Interstate 35 Business ===
Interstate 35 Business
- Location: Cameron
- Length: 3.233 mi (5.203 km)

Interstate 35 Business (I-35 Bus.) is a business loop off I-35 in the town of Cameron, stretching just over three miles (4.8 km) between exits 52 and 54 on the westside of I-35.

Major intersections
The entire route is in Cameron.

County	mi	km	Destinations	Notes
Clinton	0.000	0.000	Route BB	Continuation east beyond I-35 exit 52
Clinton	0.000	0.000	I-35 / Route 110 (CKC) – Bethany, Kansas City	Counterclockwise terminus; I-35 exit 52
Clinton	0.867	1.395	US 69 south (Walnut Street south)	Southern end of US 69 concurrency
DeKalb	2.024	3.257	US 36 Bus. west	Southern end of US 36 Bus. concurrency; former US 36
DeKalb	2.378	3.827	US 36 Bus. ends US 69 north (Walnut Street north) / US 36 west – St. Joseph, Winston	Northern end of US 69/US 36 Bus. concurrency; western end of US 36 concurrency; interchange
DeKalb	3.233	5.203	Route 110 (CKC) west / I-35 – Bethany, Kansas City	Clockwise terminus; I-35 exit 54
DeKalb	3.233	5.203	US 36 / Route 110 (CKC) east	Eastern end of US 36 concurrency; continuation beyond I-35 exit 54;
1.000 mi = 1.609 km; 1.000 km = 0.621 mi: Concurrency terminus

== See also ==
Interstate 35
Previous state: Kansas	Missouri	Next state: Iowa
