= Adams Township, Harrison County, Missouri =

Township in Missouri, U.S.

Adams Township
- Township
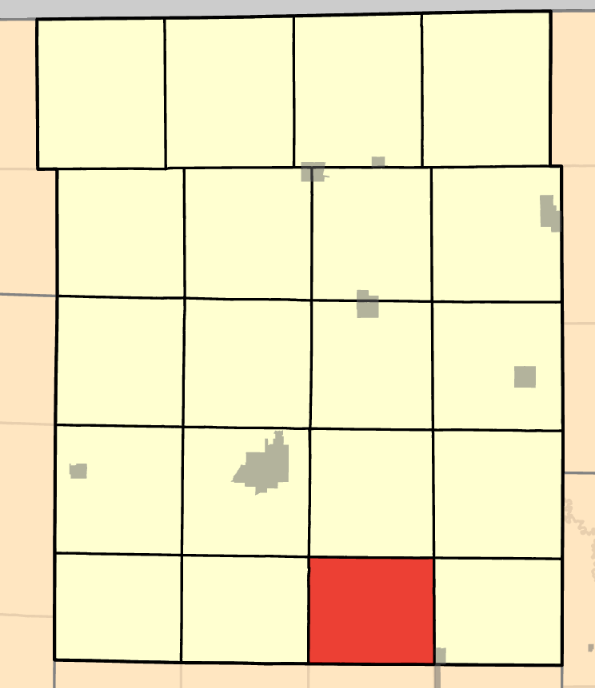

- Location within Missouri
- Coordinates: 40°10′12″N 93°55′32″W
- Country: United States
- State: Missouri
- County: Harrison
- Erected: 1872

Area
  - Total: 29.7 sq mi (76.9 km^{2})
  - Land: 29.7 sq mi (76.9 km^{2})
  - Water: 0 sq mi (0.0 km^{2})
- Elevation: 997 ft (304 m)

Population (2020)
  - Total: 147
  - Density: 5/sq mi (1.9/km^{2})
- Time zone: UTC-6 (Central (CST))
  - Summer (DST): UTC-5 (CDT)
- FIPS code: 29-00226
- GNIS feature ID: 0766713

Adams Township is a political township in Harrison County, Missouri, United States. At the 2020 census, its population was 147.

== History ==
Adams Township was created as a result of a county-wide election in November 1872, which subdivided the county into 20 municipal townships corresponding to the county's 20 congressional townships. Adams Township became all of Township 62, Range 27 within Harrison County, consisting of 30 sections.

== Settlements ==
The unincorporated community of Blue Ridge is situated in the north of the township. It was formerly a municipality, being disincorporated in 1950. This is the only community in the history of the township, making it particularly rural even for northwest Missouri. There was formerly one other post office in the township, Pleasant Ridge, located southeast of county seat Bethany.

== Geography ==
According to the United States Census Bureau, the township has a total area of 29.7 square miles (77 km^{2}), of which all 29.7 square miles (77 km^{2}) is land, with no appreciable water area.

Adams Township is of a relatively high elevation, so there are only a few smaller streams in the township, namely: Big Muddy Creek, Cypress Creek, Hickory Creek, Little Cypress Creek, and Sugar Creek.

== Transportation ==
The following highways travel through the township:

- Route 146
- Route H
- Route K
- Route MM

A railroad previously existed in Adams Township, which passed through the southern portion of the township, connecting the two nearby towns of Coffey to Gilman City.

== Education ==
Adams Township is served by three school districts: South Harrison County R-II, Gilman City R-IV, and North Daviess R-III.
