= Brimson, Missouri =

- Village
- Location of Brimson, Missouri
- Coordinates: 40°08′42″N 93°44′18″W
- Country: United States
- State: Missouri
- County: Grundy

Area
  - Total: 0.089 sq mi (0.23 km^{2})
  - Land: 0.089 sq mi (0.23 km^{2})
  - Water: 0 sq mi (0.00 km^{2})
- Elevation: 791 ft (241 m)

Population (2020)
  - Total: 50
  - Density: 574.7/sq mi (221.89/km^{2})
- Time zone: UTC-6 (Central (CST))
  - Summer (DST): UTC-5 (CDT)
- FIPS code: 29-08470
- GNIS feature ID: 2397456

Brimson is a village in western Grundy County, Missouri, United States. The population was 50 at the 2020 census.

== History ==
Brimson was laid out in 1898, and named after W. G. Brimson, a railroad official. A post office called Brimson was established in 1901, and remained in operation until 1978.

== Geography ==
Brimson is located on Missouri Route 146 approximately eight miles northwest of Trenton. The Grundy-Harrison county line is 1.2 miles to the west and Gilman City is approximately six miles to the west. Sugar Creek flows past the south side of the community. Crowder State Park is three miles to the southeast.

According to the United States Census Bureau, the village has a total area of 0.09 square miles (0.23 km^{2}), all land.

== Demographics ==
Historical population
Census	Pop.	Note	%±
1910	104		—
1920	171		64.4%
1930	181		5.8%
1940	193		6.6%
1950	139		−28.0%
1960	107		−23.0%
1970	103		−3.7%
1980	104		1.0%
1990	72		−30.8%
2000	63		−12.5%
2010	63		0.0%
2020	50		−20.6%
U.S. Decennial Census

=== 2010 census ===
At the 2010 census, there were 63 people, 30 households and 22 families living in the village. The population density was 700.0 inhabitants per square mile (270.3/km^{2}). There were 34 housing units at an average density of 377.8 per square mile (145.9/km^{2}). The racial makeup of the village was 100.0% White.

There were 30 households, of which 20.0% had children under the age of 18 living with them, 53.3% were married couples living together, 6.7% had a female householder with no husband present, 13.3% had a male householder with no wife present, and 26.7% were non-families. 26.7% of all households were made up of individuals, and 13.3% had someone living alone who was 65 years of age or older. The average household size was 2.10 and the average family size was 2.50.

The median age was 45.8 years. 14.3% of residents were under the age of 18; 9.6% were between the ages of 18 and 24; 23.8% were from 25 to 44; 33.2% were from 45 to 64; and 19% were 65 years of age or older. The population was 50.8% male and 49.2% female.

=== 2000 census ===
At the 2000 census, there were 63 people, 29 households and 18 families living in the village. The population density was 737.9 inhabitants per square mile (284.9/km^{2}). There were 36 housing units at an average density of 421.6 per square mile (162.8/km^{2}). The racial makeup was 98.41% White and 1.59% from two or more races.

There were 29 households, of which 34.5% had children under the age of 18 living with them, 48.3% were married couples living together, 10.3% had a female householder with no husband present, and 37.9% were non-families. 37.9% of all households were made up of individuals, and 17.2% had someone living alone who was 65 years of age or older. The average household size was 2.17 and the average family size was 2.83.

28.6% of the population were under the age of 18, 3.2% from 18 to 24, 30.2% from 25 to 44, 23.8% from 45 to 64, and 14.3% who were 65 years of age or older. The median age was 36 years. For every 100 females, there were 90.9 males. For every 100 females age 18 and over, there were 80.0 males.

The median household income was $19,000 and the median family income was $21,250. Males had a median income of $17,500 and females $19,583. The per capita income was $13,368. There were 20.0% of families and 12.2% of the population living below the poverty line, including 42.9% of under eighteens and none of those over 64.
