= Melbourne, Missouri =

Unincorporated community in Missouri

Coordinates: 40°08′30″N 93°47′16″W

Melbourne is an unincorporated community in Harrison County, in the U.S. state of Missouri.

The community is in the southeast corner of the county on Missouri Route 146. Gilman City is approximately four miles (6.4 km) to the west and Brimson in adjacent Grundy County is about 2.5 miles (4.0 km) to the east. Sugar Creek flows past to the north and Tombstone Creek passes the south side of the community.

== History ==
A post office called Melbourne was established in 1897, and remained in operation until 1966. The community was named after Melbourne, in Australia.
