= Pawnee, Missouri =

Unincorporated community in Harrison County, Missouri, United States

Coordinates: 40°31′19″N 94°03′03″W

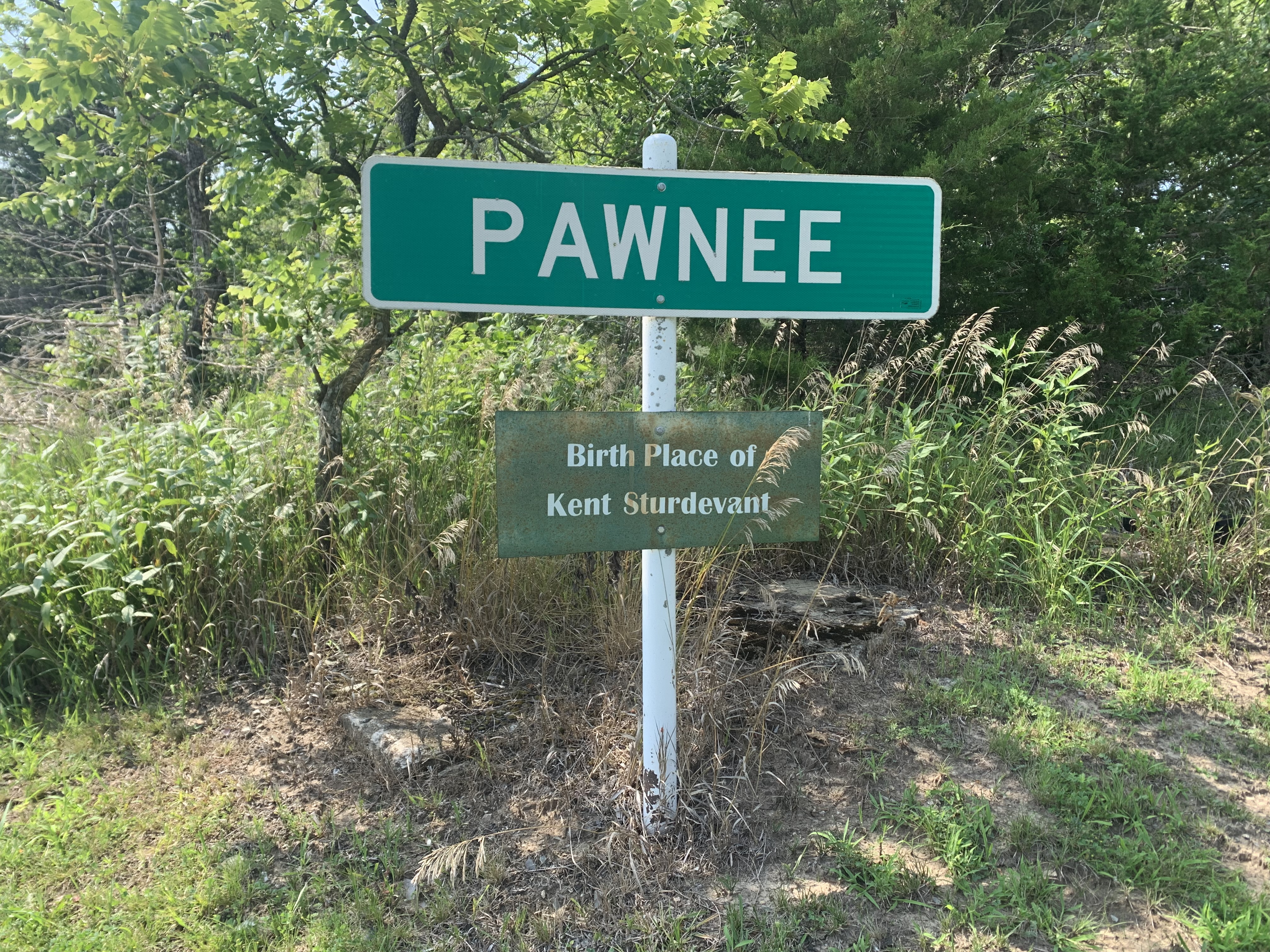
Pawnee, Missouri sign

Pawnee is an unincorporated community in Harrison County, in the U.S. state of Missouri.

The community is at the junction of Missouri Route 46 and county route YY and north of the confluence of Wolf Creek with the West Fork of Big Creek. The community of Hatfield is 5.5 miles to the west along Route 46 and Eaglevile is approximately five miles to the southeast.

== History ==
A post office called Pawnee was established in 1886, and remained in operation until 1908. The community most likely has the name of the Pawnee Indians.
