= Brooklyn, Missouri =

Unincorporated community in Missouri, U.S.

Coordinates: 40°23′54″N 94°02′27″W

Brooklyn is an unincorporated community in west central Harrison County, Missouri, United States.

The community is at the confluence of Shain Creek and the West Fork Big Creek. It is at the end of Missouri Route Z approximately two miles west of US Route 69 and five miles west of the community of Ridgeway.

== History ==
Brooklyn was platted in 1865. One source states the name is a transfer from Brooklyn, New York, while according to another source a brook (Big Creek) near the town site may have caused the name to be selected. A post office called Brooklyn was established in 1868, and remained in operation until 1908. The population was 84 in the 1920 census.
