= Crabapple Branch =

Stream in the American state of Missouri

Crabapple Branch Crab Apple Creek
- Location in Missouri

Location
- Country: United States
- State: Missouri
- County: Harrison

Physical characteristics
- Source
  - location: Harrison County, Missouri
  - coordinates: 40°15′26″N 94°01′04″W
- Mouth: Big Creek
  - coordinates: 40°11′37″N 94°04′42″W

Basin features
- Progression: Big Creek -> Grand River -> Missouri River -> Mississippi River

Crabapple Branch is a stream in Harrison County, Missouri. It is a tributary of Big Creek.

Crabapple Branch (also historically known as "Crab Apple Creek") was named for the crabapple trees in the area.

== See also ==
- List of rivers of Missouri
