= Pleasant Ridge =

Pleasant Ridge may refer to a place in the United States:

- Pleasant Ridge (Wilcox County, Alabama), a plantation near Camden, Alabama
- Pleasant Ridge, Indiana (disambiguation), several places
- Pleasant Ridge Plantation, Maine
- Pleasant Ridge, Michigan
- Pleasant Ridge, Barry County, Missouri
- Pleasant Ridge, Harrison County, Missouri
- Pleasant Ridge, Texas County, Missouri
- Pleasant Ridge, Cincinnati, Ohio
- Pleasant Ridge, Wisconsin
- Pleasant Ridge, Grant County, Wisconsin
