= Pawnee =

Pawnee initially refers to a Native American people and its language:

- Pawnee people
- Pawnee language

Pawnee is also the name of several places in the United States:

- Pawnee, Illinois
- Pawnee, Kansas
- Pawnee, Missouri
- Pawnee City, Nebraska
- Pawnee, Ohio
- Pawnee, Oklahoma
- Pawnee, Texas
- Pawnee National Grassland, Colorado
- Pawnee Township (disambiguation)
- Pawnee County (disambiguation)

Pawnee may also refer to:

- Pawnee Agency and Boarding School Historic District, an area in Pawnee County, Oklahoma
- Pawnee Aviation, an American helicopter manufacturer
- Piper PA-25 Pawnee, agricultural aircraft produced by Piper Aircraft
- Piper PA-36 Pawnee Brave, agricultural aircraft produced by Piper Aircraft
- Hiller VZ-1 Pawnee, experimental aircraft
- Pawnee (Parks and Recreation), the fictional setting of the NBC television comedy Parks and Recreation
- Pawnee (film), 1957 film starring George Montgomery
- Pawnee Peak. a mountain in Colorado
- USS Pawnee, several ships operated by the United States Navy
