= Lincoln Township, Harrison County, Missouri =

Township in Harrison County, Missouri, U.S.

Lincoln Township
- Township
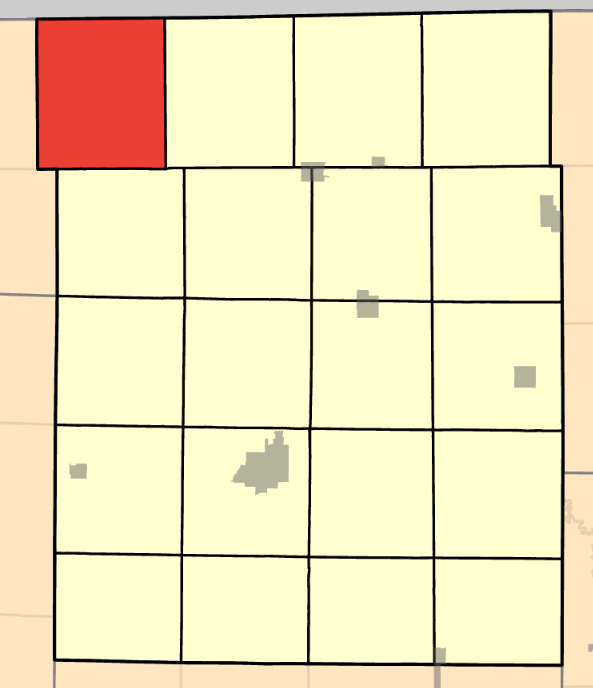
- Coordinates: 40°32′07″N 94°10′56″W
- Country: United States
- State: Missouri
- County: Harrison

Area
  - Total: 42.2 sq mi (109 km^{2})
  - Land: 42.0 sq mi (109 km^{2})
  - Water: 0.2 sq mi (0.52 km^{2}) 0.47%
- Elevation: 1,142 ft (348 m)

Population (2020)
  - Total: 133
  - Density: 3.2/sq mi (1.2/km^{2})
- FIPS code: 29-08142752
- GNIS feature ID: 766724

Lincoln Township is a township in Harrison County, Missouri, United States. At the 2020 census, its population was 133.

Lincoln Township was established in July, 1865, taking its name from President Abraham Lincoln who was assassinated just two months earlier. In 1866, the township boundaries of Lincoln, Sugar Creek, and Trail Creek were changed to the present version.
