= Akron, Missouri =

Unincorporated community in Missouri, U.S.

Coordinates: 40°31′10″N 93°49′03″W

Akron is an unincorporated community in northeast Harrison County, in the U.S. state of Missouri. The community is on Missouri Route O approximately six miles north-northwest of Cainsville and six miles east-northeast of Blythedale. The Thompson River flows past one-half mile to the east.

== History ==
Akron was platted in 1858, and named after Akron, Ohio, the native home of a share of the first settlers. A post office called Akron was established in 1861, and remained in operation until 1908.

In 1925, Akron had 35 inhabitants.
