= Blue Ridge, Missouri =

Unincorporated community in Missouri, U.S.

Coordinates: 40°11′32″N 93°56′08″W

Blue Ridge is an unincorporated community in southeast Harrison County, in the U.S. state of Missouri.

The community is located at the intersection of Missouri routes 146 and MM approximately six miles southeast of Bethany and five miles northwest of Gilman City. The site is on a broad ridge between Sugar Creek to the northeast and Cypress Creek to the southwest.

== History ==
A post office called Blue Ridge was established in 1856, and remained in operation until 1908. The community most likely was named after the ridge near the town site. It was formerly a municipality, being disincorporated in 1950.

== Demographics ==
Historical population
Census	Pop.	Note	%±
1900	123		—
1910	67		−45.5%
1920	50		−25.4%
1930	73		46.0%
1940	58		−20.5%
1950	27		−53.4%
Missouri Census Data Center
