= Mitchellville, Missouri =

Unincorporated community in Missouri, U.S.

Coordinates: 40°12′43″N 94°04′18″W

Mitchellville is an unincorporated community in Harrison County, in the U.S. state of Missouri.

The community is on the east side of US Route 69 approximately four miles south-southeast of Bethany. Big Creek flows past the west side of the community.

== History ==
An early variant name was "Woodbine". A post office called Woodbine was established in 1857, the name was changed to Mitchellville in 1865, and the post office closed in 1888. The present name is after James Mitchell, a pioneer citizen.
