= Andover, Missouri =

Unincorporated community in Missouri, U.S.

Coordinates: 40°33′54″N 93°53′43″W

Andover is an unincorporated community in northeast Harrison County, in the U.S. state of Missouri. The community is Missouri Route T six miles north of Blythedale and three quarter mile south of the Missouri-Iowa border. Interstate 35 passes three miles to the west.

== History ==
Andover had its start in 1873 when the Burlington Railroad was extended to that point. A post office called Andover was established in 1872, and remained in operation until 1943.

In 1925, Andover had 54 inhabitants.
