= Shain Creek =

Stream in the US states of Iowa and Missouri

Coordinates: 40°23′24″N 94°02′31″W

Shain Creek (also called Shane Creek) is a stream in the U.S. states of Iowa and Missouri. It is a tributary of West Fork Big Creek.

The stream headwaters arise in southern Iowa just south of the community of Tuskeego and it flows south passing just west of Lamoni, where it is impounded to form Lake LaShane, and into Missouri. The stream continues south passing about one-half mile west of Eagleville and on to its confluence approximately one-half mile south of the community of Brooklyn.

Shain Creek has the name of the local Shain family.

== See also ==
- List of rivers of Iowa
- List of rivers of Missouri
