= Clay Township, Harrison County, Missouri =

Township in Harrison County, Missouri, U.S.

Clay Township
- Township
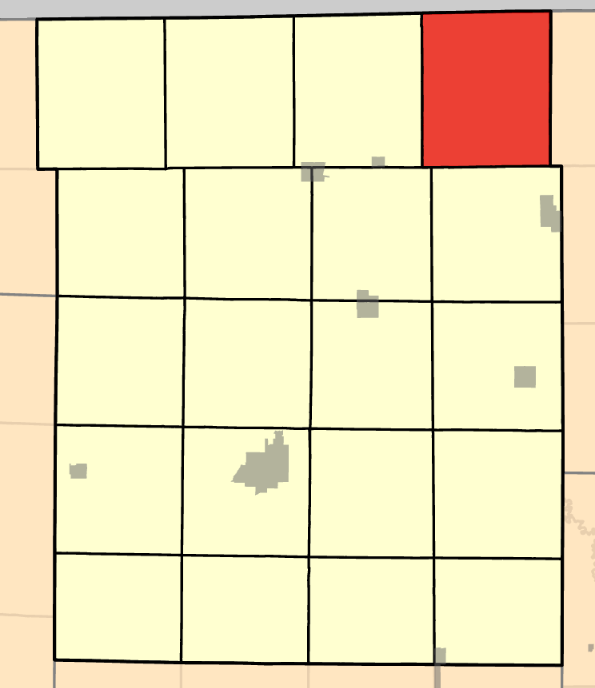
- Coordinates: 40°31′18″N 93°50′02″W
- Country: United States
- State: Missouri
- County: Harrison

Area
  - Total: 43.58 sq mi (112.9 km^{2})
  - Land: 43.57 sq mi (112.8 km^{2})
  - Water: 0.01 sq mi (0.026 km^{2}) 0.02%
- Elevation: 942 ft (287 m)

Population (2020)
  - Total: 59
  - Density: 1.4/sq mi (0.54/km^{2})
- FIPS code: 29-08114392
- GNIS feature ID: 766716

Clay Township is a township in Harrison County, Missouri, United States. At the 2020 census, its population was 59.

Clay Township was split from Marion Township in March, 1858 and takes its name from Henry Clay of Kentucky.
