= Grant Township, Harrison County, Missouri =

Township in Harrison County, Missouri, U.S.

Grant Township
- Township
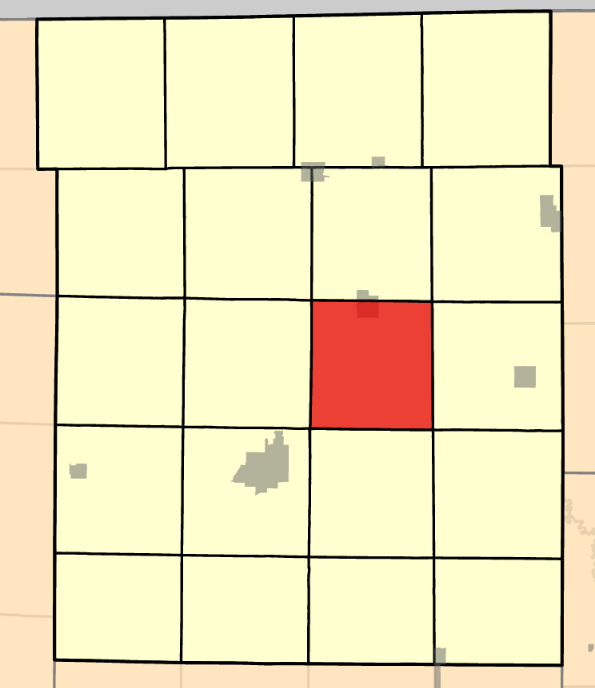
- Coordinates: 40°19′52″N 93°55′53″W
- Country: United States
- State: Missouri
- County: Harrison

Area
  - Total: 34.4 sq mi (89 km^{2})
  - Land: 34.25 sq mi (88.7 km^{2})
  - Water: 0.15 sq mi (0.39 km^{2}) 0.44%
- Elevation: 1,040 ft (320 m)

Population (2020)
  - Total: 417
  - Density: 12.2/sq mi (4.7/km^{2})
- FIPS code: 29-08128486
- GNIS feature ID: 766721

Grant Township is a township in Harrison County, Missouri, United States. At the 2020 census, its population was 417.

Grant Township was divided from Union Township in June, 1872 and took its name from the local Grant family of pioneer citizens.
