= White Oak Township, Harrison County, Missouri =

Township in Harrison County, Missouri, U.S.

White Oak Township
- Township
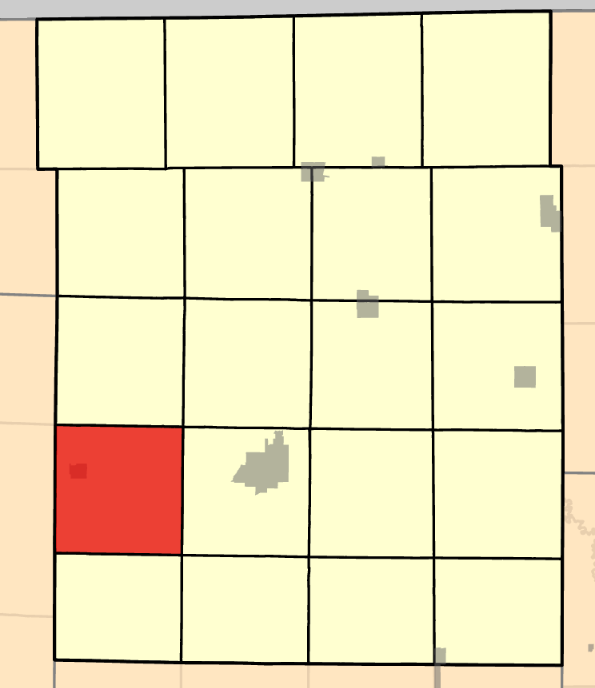
- Coordinates: 40°14′55″N 94°09′00″W
- Country: United States
- State: Missouri
- County: Harrison

Area
  - Total: 36.18 sq mi (93.7 km^{2})
  - Land: 35.92 sq mi (93.0 km^{2})
  - Water: 0.26 sq mi (0.67 km^{2}) 0.72%
- Elevation: 988 ft (301 m)

Population (2020)
  - Total: 461
  - Density: 12.8/sq mi (4.9/km^{2})
- FIPS code: 29-08179486
- GNIS feature ID: 766732

White Oak Township is a township in Harrison County, Missouri, United States. At the 2020 census, its population was 461.

White Oak Township was erected in September 1860. White Oak Township takes its name from White Oak Creek.
