= Missouri Route 46 =

State highway in Missouri, U.S.

Route 46

Route information
- Maintained by MoDOT
- Length: 85.905 mi (138.251 km)
- Existed: 1922–present

Major junctions
- West end: US 59 in Fairfax
- Route 113 south of Quitman; US 71 / US 136 in Maryville; Route 246 east of Sheridan; US 169 in Grant City
- East end: US 69 near Eagleville

Location
- Country: United States
- State: Missouri
- Counties: Atchison; Harrison; Nodaway; Worth

Highway system
- Missouri State Highway System; Interstate; US; State; Supplemental
← Route 45	→ Route 47

Route 46 is a highway in northwest Missouri. Its eastern terminus is at U.S. Route 69 north of Eagleville; its western terminus is at U.S. Route 59 east of Fairfax.

== History ==
Route 46 is one of the original state highways from 1922. Its original termini were the east and west county lines of Worth which it ran completely across.

== Route Description ==
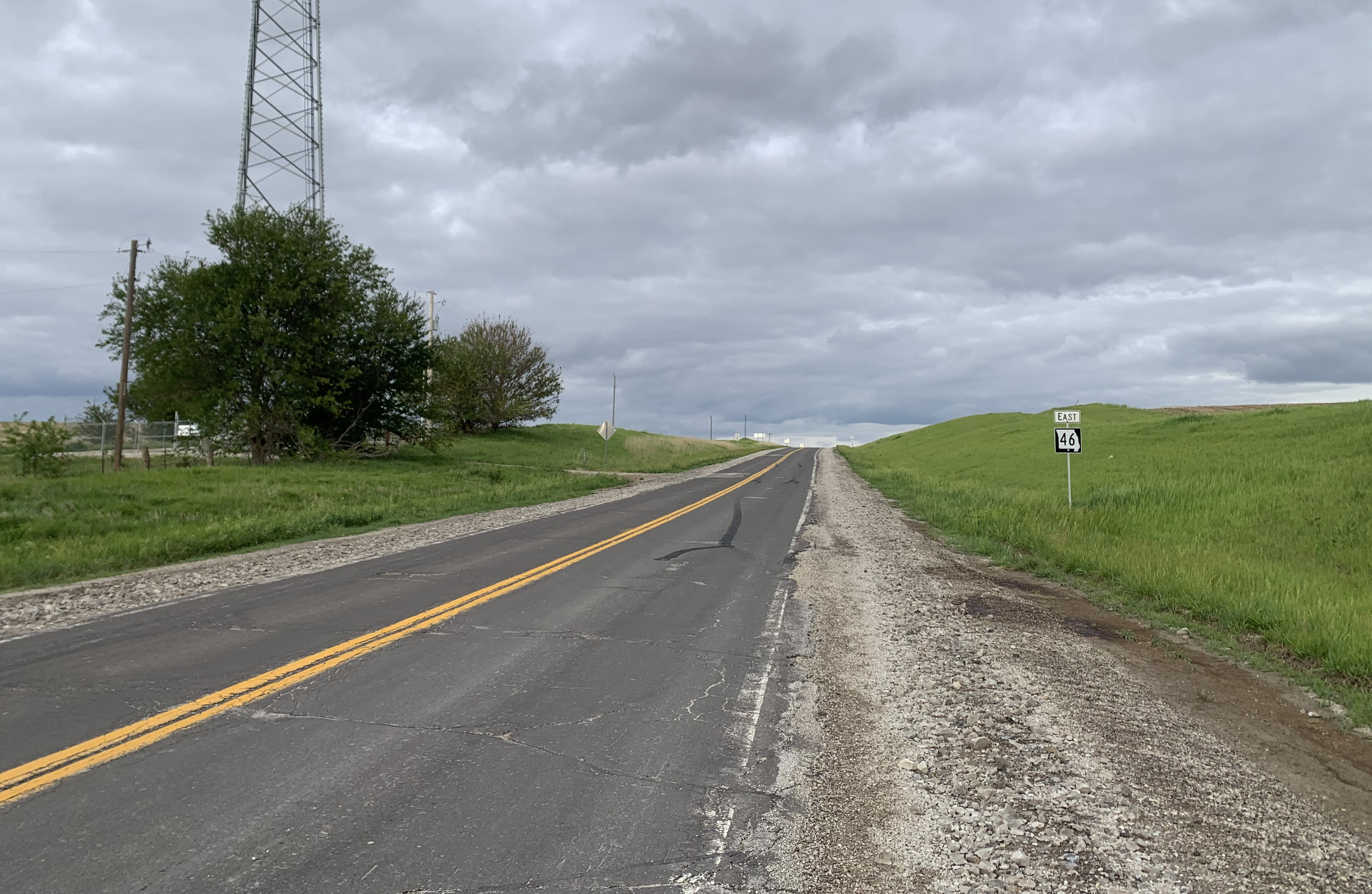
Western terminus of Route 46, facing east

Beginning at US 59 just east of Fairfax, Route 46 travels east through Atchison County. After 10 miles (16 km) of traveling east, Route 46 enters Nodaway County and travels on the southern boundary of Bilby Ranch Lake Conservation Area for 3 more miles. Another 2 miles (3.2 km) east, the highway crosses the Nodaway River, and shortly thereafter intersects with Route 113 about 3 miles (4.8 km) north of Skidmore. Continuing eastward, the highway travels about 10 miles (16 km) towards Maryville, on its way it crosses White Cloud Creek and passes south of the Northwest Missouri Regional Airport. It enters Maryville and travels as 1st street about 1 mile (1.6 km) before intersecting Bus. US 71 in downtown Maryville. After continuing another mile east through town, Route 46 junctions with US 71 and US 136.

Leaving Maryville, it continues concurrent with US 136 east, where it crosses the One Hundred and Two River, passes south of Mozingo Lake, and crosses the Platte River, before reaching the point where Route 46 and US 136 separate just south of Ravenwood. Route 46 travels north through Ravenwood and heads northeasterly where it passes by Parnell and enters Worth County. A few miles after, Route 46 junctions with Route 246, east of Sheridan, and then turns east-southeast where it travels about 9 miles (14 km) before reaching Grant City. Just east of Grant City, the highway intersects with US 169 and continues east about 6 miles (9.7 km) to Allendale. Route 46 continues northeasterly in eastern Worth County to where it enters Harrison County and soon after reaches Hatfield. Route 46 travels east and southeast 9 miles (14 km) to its eastern terminus at the junction with US 69 6 miles (9.7 km) north of Eagleville.

== Major intersections ==
County	Location	mi	km	Destinations	Notes
Atchison	Clark Township	0.000	0.000	US 59 – Craig, Fairfax	
Nodaway	Green Township	16.219	26.102	Route 113 – Quitman, Skidmore	
Nodaway	Maryville	26.639	42.871	US 71 Bus. south (South Main Street)	West end of US 71 Bus. overlap
Nodaway	Maryville	26.767	43.077	US 71 Bus. north (North Main Street)	East end of US 71 Bus. overlap
Nodaway	Maryville	28.026	45.103	US 71 / US 136 west – Clearmont, St. Joseph, Kansas City	West end of US 136 overlap
Nodaway	Jackson Township	37.398	60.186	US 136 east – Conception Junction	East end of US 136 overlap
Worth	Union Township	51.446	82.794	Route 246 west – Sheridan	
Worth	Grant City	61.718	99.325	US 169 – Redding, Iowa, Stanberry	
Harrison	Colfax Township	85.905	138.251	US 69 – Lamoni, Iowa, Eagleville	
1.000 mi = 1.609 km; 1.000 km = 0.621 mi: Concurrency terminus
