= George Booth (cartoonist) =

American cartoonist (1926–2022)

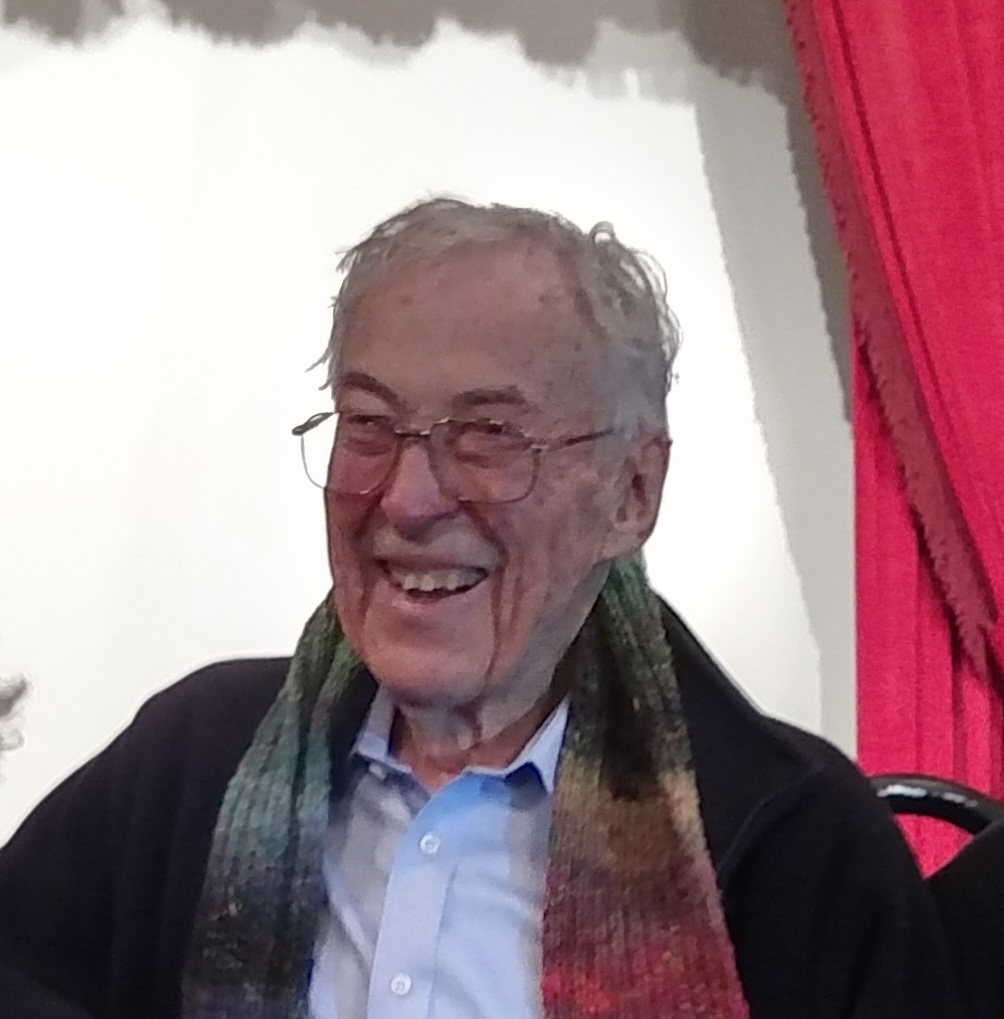
- Born: June 28, 1926 Cainsville, Missouri, U.S.
- Died: November 1, 2022 (aged 96) New York City, U.S.
- Area: Cartoonist
- Notable works: Spot, Local Item
- Awards: National Cartoonists Society Gag Cartoon Award, 1993; National Cartoonists Society Milton Caniff Lifetime Achievement Award, 2010

George Booth (June 28, 1926 – November 1, 2022) was an American cartoonist who worked for The New Yorker magazine. His cartoons usually featured an older everyman, everywoman, or everycouple beset by modern complexity, perplexing each other, or interacting with cats and dogs.

== Early life ==
Born in Cainsville, Missouri, on June 28, 1926, Booth was the son of schoolteachers; his mother, Irma (née Swindle) Booth (1903–1989), was also a musician and fine artist and cartoonist, and his father, William Earl "Billy" Booth (1898–1982), became a school administrator in Fairfax, Missouri, where Booth grew up on a farm.

== Career ==
Drafted into the United States Marine Corps in 1944, Booth was invited to re-enlist and join the Corps' Leatherneck magazine as a staff cartoonist; when re-drafted for the Korean War, he was ordered back to Leatherneck.

As a civilian, Booth moved to New York City where he struggled as an artist, married, then worked as an art director in the magazine world. He also worked on the comic strip Spot in 1956–1957.

Fed up, Booth quit and pursued cartooning full-time, beginning successfully in 1969, with the sale of his first New Yorker cartoon. One signature element of Booth's generally messy or run-down interiors is a ceiling light bulb on a cord pulled by another cord attached to an electrical appliance such as a toaster. Most of the household features in his cartoons were drawn from his own home. He described one of his cats, adopted later in his career, as being "more like my drawing than the drawings ... when he lies down, his back feet go out in back – straight out."

Booth also created the comic strip Local Item in 1986–1987.

== Personal life ==
Booth lived for many years in Stony Brook, New York, with his wife Dione (d. 2022), whom he married in 1958. They later lived in Brooklyn, where he continued to draw cartoons and collect artwork from local artists.

Booth died from complications of dementia at home in Brooklyn, on November 1, 2022, at age 96, six days after Dione died of pancreatic cancer on October 26 at age 85. His daughter Sarah said, "All his life, he'd sit in his studio and come up with captions and laugh at his own work.". The New Yorker honored Booth one month after his death, reprinting a sketch entitled "Believe" as the cover of the December 19th edition of the magazine.

== Awards ==
The National Cartoonists Society recognized his work with the Gag Cartoon Award in 1993 and the Milton Caniff Lifetime Achievement Award in 2010.

== Publications ==
Booth's cartoons have been collected in the following books:

- Think Good Thoughts About a Pussycat (1975)
- Rehearsal's Off! (1976)
- Pussycats Need Love, Too (1981)
- A Friend Is Friendly (1981)
- Omnibooth: The Best of George Booth (1984)
- Booth Again! (1989)
- The Essential George Booth (1998)
- About Dogs (2009)
- Spot the Dog (2023)
