= Hamilton Township, Harrison County, Missouri =

Township in Harrison County, Missouri, U.S.

Hamilton Township
- Township
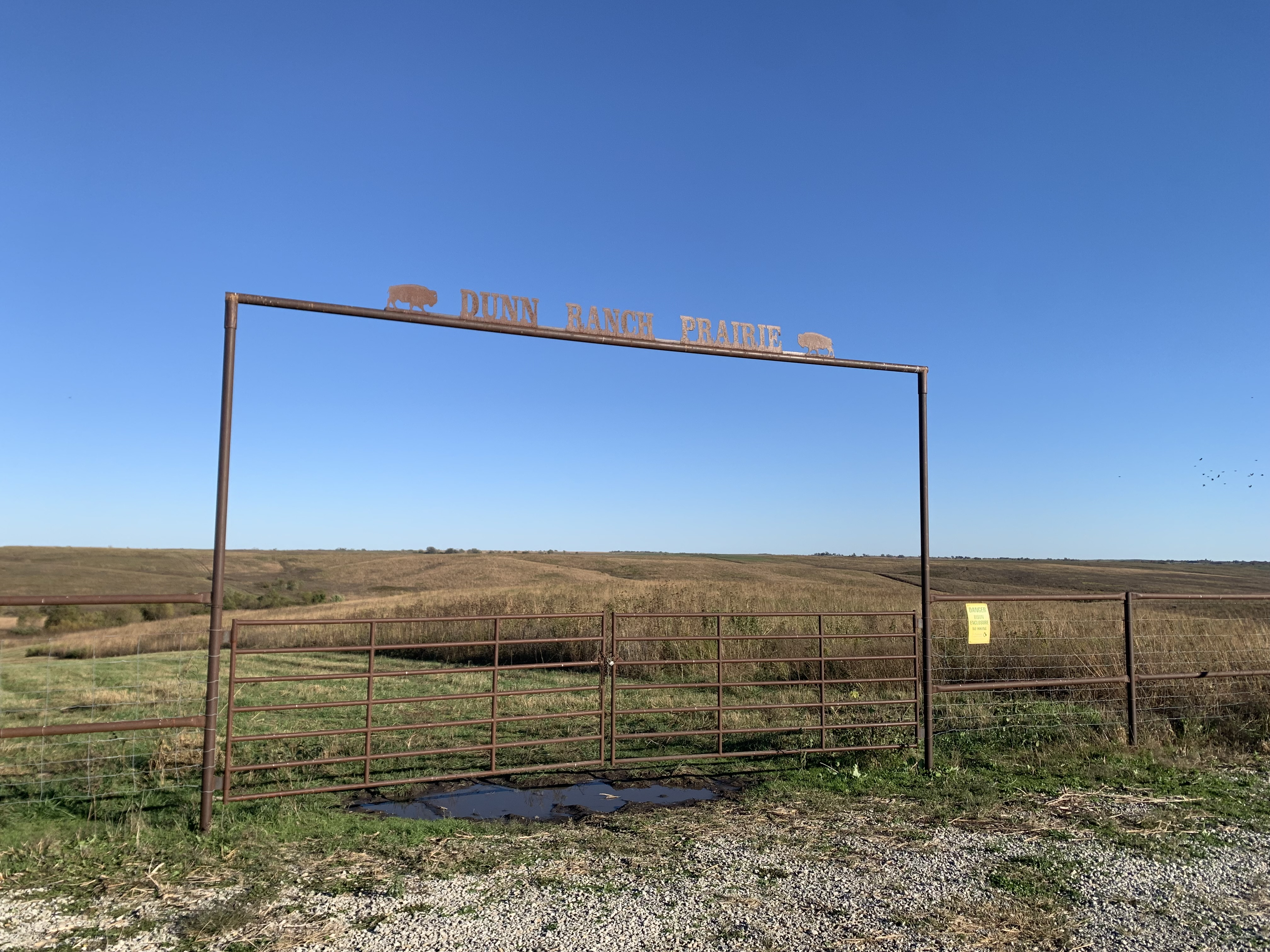
- Dunn Ranch Prairie in Hamilton Township

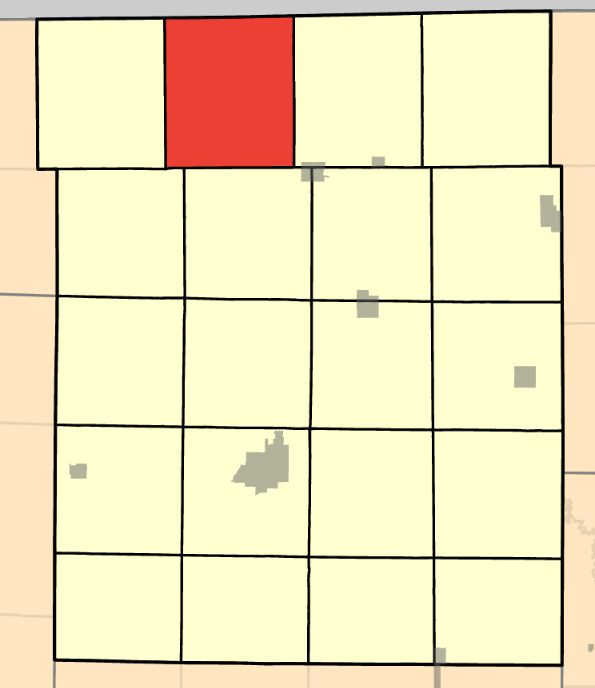
- Coordinates: 40°31′31″N 94°04′13″W
- Country: United States
- State: Missouri
- County: Harrison

Area
  - Total: 42.56 sq mi (110.2 km^{2})
  - Land: 42.3 sq mi (110 km^{2})
  - Water: 0.26 sq mi (0.67 km^{2}) 0.61%
- Elevation: 971 ft (296 m)

Population (2020)
  - Total: 106
  - Density: 2.5/sq mi (0.97/km^{2})
- FIPS code: 29-08130070
- GNIS feature ID: 766722

Hamilton Township is a township in Harrison County, Missouri, United States. At the 2020 census, its population was 106.

Hamilton Township was created due to a county-wide November 1872 election, which would subdivide the county into 20 municipal townships corresponding with the county's 20 congressional townships.
