= Cypress Township, Harrison County, Missouri =

Township in Harrison County, Missouri, U.S.

Cypress Township
- Township
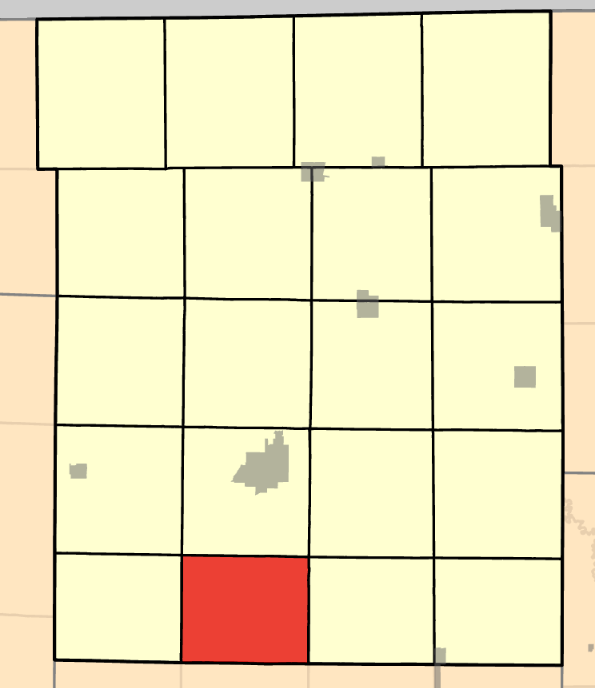
- Coordinates: 40°10′34″N 94°02′15″W
- Country: United States
- State: Missouri
- County: Harrison

Area
  - Total: 30.24 sq mi (78.3 km^{2})
  - Land: 30.13 sq mi (78.0 km^{2})
  - Water: 0.11 sq mi (0.28 km^{2}) 0.36%
- Elevation: 846 ft (258 m)

Population (2020)
  - Total: 162
  - Density: 5.4/sq mi (2.1/km^{2})
- FIPS code: 29-08117956
- GNIS feature ID: 766718

Cypress Township is a township in Harrison County, Missouri, United States. At the 2020 census, its population was 162.

Cypress Township was erected in September, 1858. and most likely was so named on account of the cypress trees within its borders.
