= Trail Creek Township, Harrison County, Missouri =

Township in Harrison County, Missouri, U.S.

Trail Creek Township
- Township
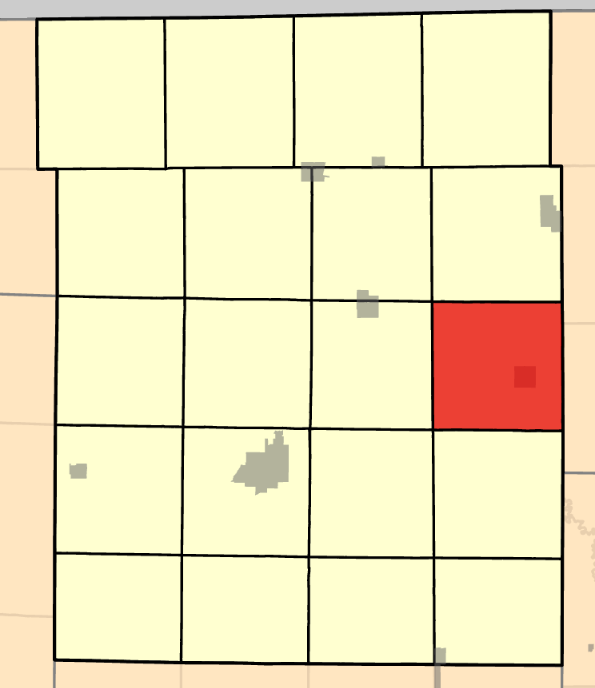
- Coordinates: 40°20′13″N 93°49′36″W
- Country: United States
- State: Missouri
- County: Harrison

Area
  - Total: 36.84 sq mi (95.4 km^{2})
  - Land: 36.5 sq mi (95 km^{2})
  - Water: 0.34 sq mi (0.88 km^{2}) 0.92%
- Elevation: 912 ft (278 m)

Population (2020)
  - Total: 168
  - Density: 4.6/sq mi (1.8/km^{2})
- FIPS code: 29-08173744
- GNIS feature ID: 766729

Trail Creek Township is a township in Harrison County, Missouri, United States. At the 2020 census, its population was 168.

The organization date of Trail Creek Township was in December 1855. It was split of from Sugar Creek Township. Its name likely comes from the nearby stream Trail Creek.
