= Dallas Township, Harrison County, Missouri =

Township in Harrison County, Missouri, U.S.

Dallas Township
- Township
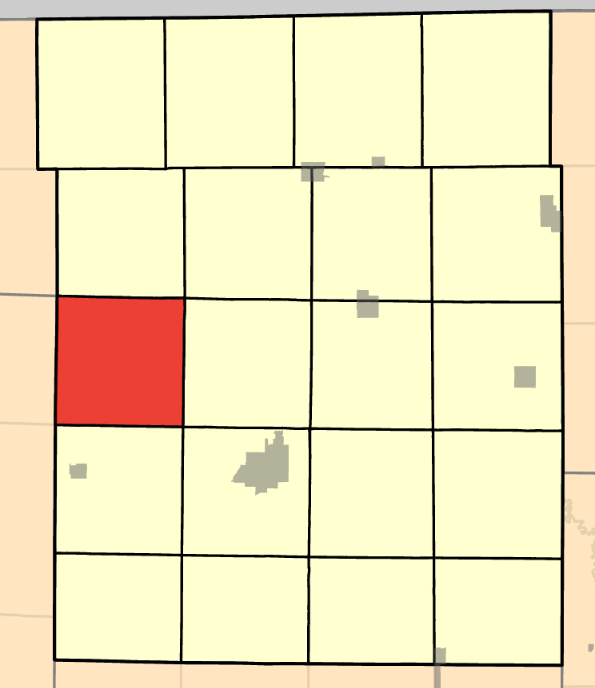
- Coordinates: 40°20′18″N 94°09′24″W
- Country: United States
- State: Missouri
- County: Harrison

Area
  - Total: 36.23 sq mi (93.8 km^{2})
  - Land: 36.03 sq mi (93.3 km^{2})
  - Water: 0.2 sq mi (0.52 km^{2}) 0.55%
- Elevation: 1,079 ft (329 m)

Population (2020)
  - Total: 224
  - Density: 6.2/sq mi (2.4/km^{2})
- FIPS code: 29-08118064
- GNIS feature ID: 766719

Dallas Township is a township in Harrison County, Missouri, United States. At the 2020 census, its population was 224.

Dallas Township was established in 1845, taking its name from George M. Dallas, 11th Vice President of the United States.
