= White Oak Creek (Sampson Creek tributary) =

Stream in Missouri, US

White Oak Creek is a stream in Harrison County in the U.S. state of Missouri. It is a tributary of Sampson Creek.

The stream headwaters arise at 40°21′22″N 94°08′50″W approximately one mile southeast of Martinsville and it flows to the south passing under US Route 136 two miles east of New Hampton. It continues to the south-southwest crossing under Missouri Route P one half mile west of the small community of Matkins. The stream continues for about two miles further to its confluence with Sampson Creek one-half mile east of Missouri Route ZZ at 40°09′00″N 94°11′50″W.

White Oak Creek most likely was named for the white oak trees lining its course.

== See also ==
- List of rivers of Missouri
