= Marion Township, Harrison County, Missouri =

Township in Harrison County, Missouri, U.S.

Marion Township
- Township
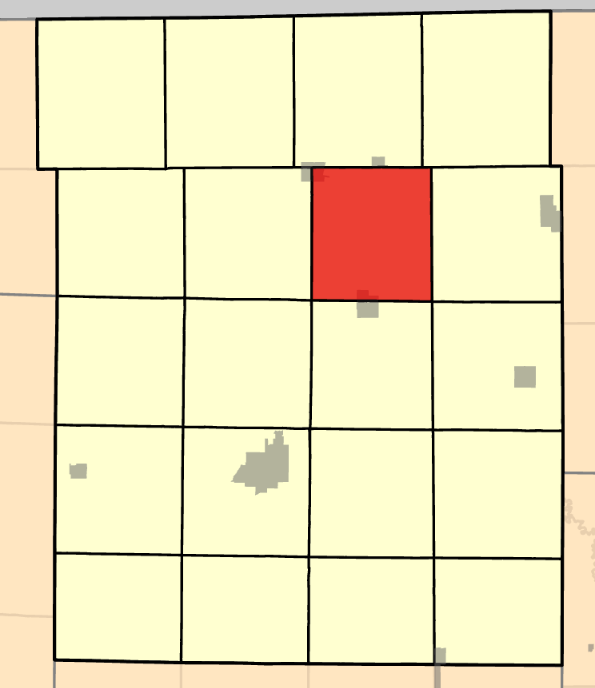
- Coordinates: 40°25′52″N 93°55′27″W
- Country: United States
- State: Missouri
- County: Harrison

Area
  - Total: 35.21 sq mi (91.2 km^{2})
  - Land: 34.88 sq mi (90.3 km^{2})
  - Water: 0.33 sq mi (0.85 km^{2}) 0.94%
- Elevation: 1,004 ft (306 m)

Population (2020)
  - Total: 342
  - Density: 9.8/sq mi (3.8/km^{2})
- FIPS code: 29-08146046
- GNIS feature ID: 766726

Marion Township is a township in Harrison County, Missouri, United States. At the 2020 census, its population was 342.

Marion Township was erected in May 1846 and was split off from Bethany Township, taking its name from Francis Marion, an officer in the Revolutionary War.
