= Bolton, Missouri =

Unincorporated community in Missouri, U.S.

Coordinates: 40°13′31″N 93°50′07″W

Bolton is an unincorporated community in eastern Harrison County, in the U.S. state of Missouri.

The community is on a ridge between Cat Creek to the east and Fox Creek to the west approximately ten miles east-southeast of Bethany. The Wayne Helton Memorial State Wildlife Area is adjacent to the northeast.

== History ==
A post office called Bolton was established in 1858, and remained in operation until 1903. An early variant name was "Browns", after the local Brown family.
