= Butler Township, Harrison County, Missouri =

Township in Harrison County, Missouri, U.S.

Butler Township
- Township
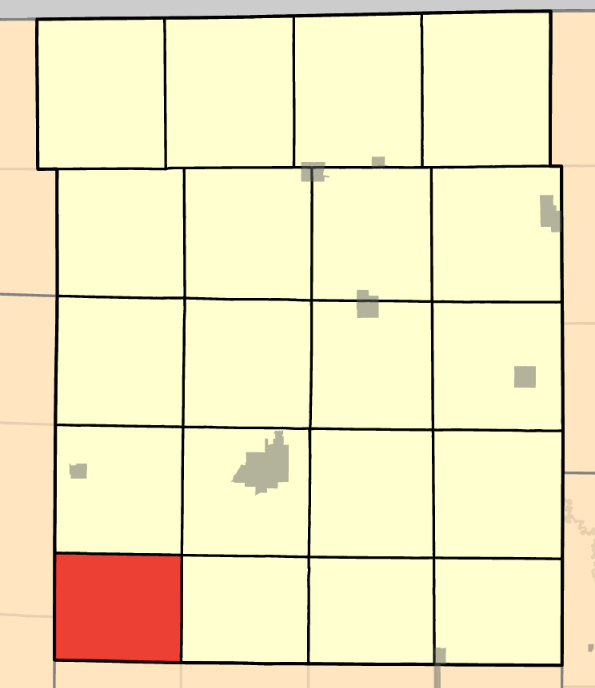
- Coordinates: 40°10′03″N 94°09′23″W
- Country: United States
- State: Missouri
- County: Harrison

Area
  - Total: 30.2 sq mi (78 km^{2})
  - Land: 30.08 sq mi (77.9 km^{2})
  - Water: 0.12 sq mi (0.31 km^{2}) 0.4%
- Elevation: 938 ft (286 m)

Population (2020)
  - Total: 97
  - Density: 3.2/sq mi (1.2/km^{2})
- FIPS code: 29-08110072
- GNIS feature ID: 766715

Butler Township is a township in Harrison County, Missouri, United States. At the 2020 census, its population was 97. It was one of the three original townships.

Butler Township has the name of Aseph M. Butler, a pioneer citizen. Butler is all part of congressional 62, range 29, lying within Harrison County.
