= Madison Township, Harrison County, Missouri =

Township in Harrison County, Missouri, U.S.

Madison Township
- Township
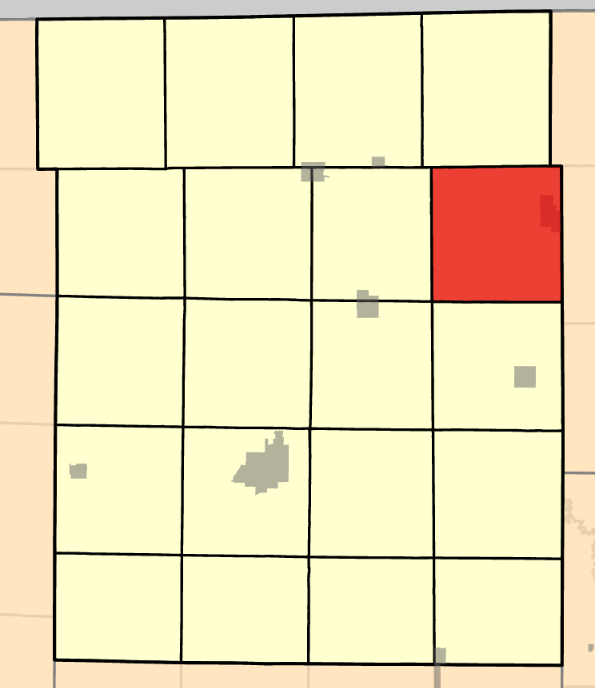
- Coordinates: 40°25′38″N 93°49′11″W
- Country: United States
- State: Missouri
- County: Harrison

Area
  - Total: 38.73 sq mi (100.3 km^{2})
  - Land: 38.49 sq mi (99.7 km^{2})
  - Water: 0.24 sq mi (0.62 km^{2}) 0.62%
- Elevation: 919 ft (280 m)

Population (2020)
  - Total: 406
  - Density: 10.5/sq mi (4.1/km^{2})
- FIPS code: 29-08145398
- GNIS feature ID: 766725

Madison Township is a township in Harrison County, Missouri, United States. At the 2020 census, its population was 406. It was one of the three original townships.

Madison Township most likely was named after President James Madison.
