= Matkins, Missouri =

Unincorporated community in Missouri, U.S.

Coordinates: 40°10′55″N 94°09′49″W

Matkins is an unincorporated community in southwest Harrison County, in the U.S. state of Missouri.

The community is at the junction of Missouri routes P and TT. The site is on a ridge between White Oak Creek to the west and Little Sampson Creek to the east. The community is approximately eight miles southwest of Bethany.

== History ==
A post office called Matkins was established in 1880, and remained in operation until 1907. The community bears the name of an early settler.
