= Cainsville, Missouri =

- City
- Location of Cainsville, Missouri
- Coordinates: 40°26′23″N 93°46′29″W
- Country: United States
- State: Missouri
- County: Harrison

Area
  - Total: 1.37 sq mi (3.55 km^{2})
  - Land: 1.37 sq mi (3.55 km^{2})
  - Water: 0 sq mi (0.00 km^{2})
- Elevation: 869 ft (265 m)

Population (2020)
  - Total: 283
  - Density: 206.4/sq mi (79.69/km^{2})
- Time zone: UTC-6 (Central (CST))
  - Summer (DST): UTC-5 (CDT)
- ZIP code: 64632
- Area code: 660
- FIPS code: 29-10342
- GNIS feature ID: 2393490
- Website: www.cainsville.com

Cainsville is a city in eastern Harrison County, Missouri, United States. The population was 283 at the 2020 census.

== History ==
Cainsville had its start in 1854 when Peter Cain built a watermill on the site. As more workers arrived, a post office, blacksmith shop and trading post were necessarily started up, so that by 1858, a small town had developed.

== Geography ==
Cainsville is located one half mile west of the Harrison-Mercer county line on the east side of the Thompson River floodplain. The community lies at the intersection of Missouri routes N and V approximately seven miles north of Mount Moriah. Princeton lies approximately ten miles to the east-southeast in Mercer County.

According to the United States Census Bureau, the city has a total area of 1.37 square miles (3.55 km^{2}), all land.

== Demographics ==
Historical population
| Census | Pop. | Note | %± |
|---|---|---|---|
| 1880 | 198 | | — |
| 1890 | 418 | | 111.1% |
| 1900 | 743 | | 77.8% |
| 1910 | 887 | | 19.4% |
| 1920 | 1,051 | | 18.5% |
| 1930 | 765 | | −27.2% |
| 1940 | 765 | | 0.0% |
| 1950 | 618 | | −19.2% |
| 1960 | 495 | | −19.9% |
| 1970 | 454 | | −8.3% |
| 1980 | 496 | | 9.3% |
| 1990 | 387 | | −22.0% |
| 2000 | 370 | | −4.4% |
| 2010 | 290 | | −21.6% |
| 2020 | 283 | | −2.4% |
U.S. Decennial Census

=== 2010 census ===
As of the census of 2010, there were 290 people, 126 households, and 83 families living in the city. The population density was 211.7 inhabitants per square mile (81.7/km^{2}). There were 175 housing units at an average density of 127.7 per square mile (49.3/km^{2}). The racial makeup of the city was 97.9% White, 0.3% Native American, 1.4% Pacific Islander, and 0.3% from two or more races. Hispanic or Latino of any race were 1.0% of the population.

There were 126 households, of which 27.8% had children under the age of 18 living with them, 52.4% were married couples living together, 9.5% had a female householder with no husband present, 4.0% had a male householder with no wife present, and 34.1% were non-families. 31.0% of all households were made up of individuals, and 20.7% had someone living alone who was 65 years of age or older. The average household size was 2.30 and the average family size was 2.90.

The median age in the city was 44.9 years. 21.4% of residents were under the age of 18; 8.3% were between the ages of 18 and 24; 20.7% were from 25 to 44; 28.9% were from 45 to 64; and 20.7% were 65 years of age or older. The gender makeup of the city was 48.3% male and 51.7% female.

=== 2000 census ===
As of the census of 2000, there were 370 people, 168 households, and 102 families living in the city. The population density was 269.2 inhabitants per square mile (103.9/km^{2}). There were 216 housing units at an average density of 157.2 per square mile (60.7/km^{2}). The racial makeup of the city was 98.65% White, and 1.35% from two or more races. Hispanic or Latino of any race were 0.27% of the population.

There were 168 households, out of which 28.6% had children under the age of 18 living with them, 51.2% were married couples living together, 8.3% had a female householder with no husband present, and 38.7% were non-families. 36.3% of all households were made up of individuals, and 22.6% had someone living alone who was 65 years of age or older. The average household size was 2.20 and the average family size was 2.89.

In the city the population was spread out, with 23.0% under the age of 18, 5.7% from 18 to 24, 27.6% from 25 to 44, 21.6% from 45 to 64, and 22.2% who were 65 years of age or older. The median age was 41 years. For every 100 females, there were 90.7 males. For every 100 females age 18 and over, there were 91.3 males.

The median income for a household in the city was $21,250, and the median income for a family was $26,944. Males had a median income of $23,125 versus $17,625 for females. The per capita income for the city was $12,046. About 16.7% of families and 21.5% of the population were below the poverty line, including 24.4% of those under age 18 and 26.8% of those age 65 or over.

== Education ==
It is in the Cainsville R-I School District
