= Pleasant Ridge, Harrison County, Missouri =

Unincorporated community in Missouri, U.S.

Coordinates: 40°10′14″N 94°00′52″W

Pleasant Ridge is an unincorporated community in Harrison County, in the U.S. state of Missouri.

== History ==
A post office called Pleasant Ridge was established in 1854, and remained in operation until 1876. The name Pleasant Ridge is commendatory.
