= Bethany Township, Harrison County, Missouri =

Township in Harrison County, Missouri, U.S.

Bethany Township
- Township
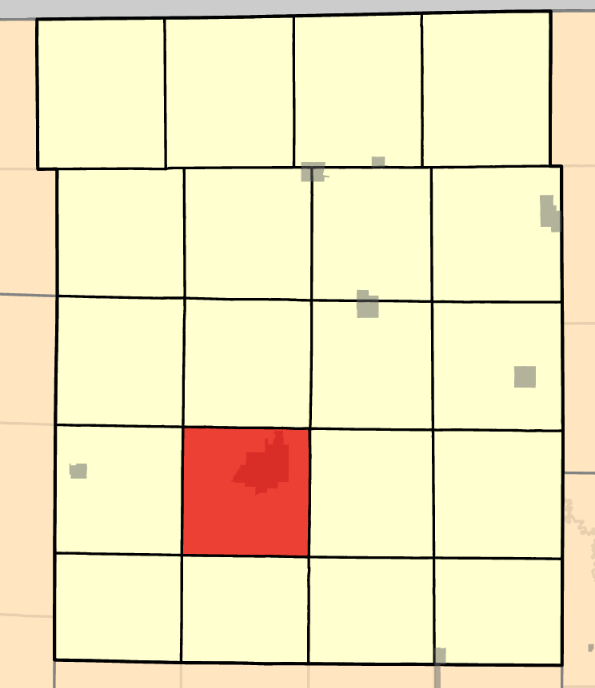
- Coordinates: 40°15′02″N 94°02′36″W
- Country: United States
- State: Missouri
- County: Harrison

Area
  - Total: 36.11 sq mi (93.5 km^{2})
  - Land: 35.81 sq mi (92.7 km^{2})
  - Water: 0.3 sq mi (0.78 km^{2}) 0.83%
- Elevation: 922 ft (281 m)

Population (2020)
  - Total: 3,320
  - Density: 92.7/sq mi (35.8/km^{2})
- FIPS code: 29-08105086
- GNIS feature ID: 766714

Bethany Township is a township in Harrison County, Missouri, United States. At the 2020 census, its population was 3320.

Bethany township was created due to a county-wide November 1872 election, which would subdivide the county into 20 municipal townships corresponding with the county's 20 congressional townships. Bethany Township takes its name from the community of Bethany, Missouri.
