= Pattonsburg, Missouri =

City in Daviess County, Missouri, United States

- City
- Location of Pattonsburg, Missouri
- Coordinates: 40°04′17″N 94°06′22″W
- Country: United States
- State: Missouri
- County: Daviess

Area
  - Total: 0.61 sq mi (1.57 km^{2})
  - Land: 0.61 sq mi (1.57 km^{2})
  - Water: 0 sq mi (0.00 km^{2})
- Elevation: 860 ft (260 m)

Population (2020)
  - Total: 314
  - Density: 517.9/sq mi (199.95/km^{2})
- Time zone: UTC-6 (Central (CST))
  - Summer (DST): UTC-5 (CDT)
- ZIP code: 64670
- Area code: 660
- FIPS code: 29-56558
- GNIS feature ID: 2396162
- Website: www.pattonsburgmo.org

Pattonsburg is a city in northwest Daviess County, Missouri, United States. The population was 314 at the 2020 census.

== History ==
Pattonsburg's current location is four miles north of the previous spot, Old Pattonsburg, as it is referred to today. The old town was devastated by the Great Flood of 1993 and was forced to move; therefore, town residents chose the new location that is located on higher ground.

== Geography ==
Pattonsburg is located in northwest Daviess County just west of U.S. Route 69 and two miles west of I-35. Big Creek flows past east of the town and joins the Grand River approximately two miles to the southeast.

According to the United States Census Bureau, the city has a total area of 0.61 square miles (1.58 km^{2}), all land.

== Demographics ==
Historical population
Census	Pop.	Note	%±
1890	532		—
1900	1,065		100.2%
1910	1,044		−2.0%
1920	1,068		2.3%
1930	1,009		−5.5%
1940	1,017		0.8%
1950	883		−13.2%
1960	753		−14.7%
1970	540		−28.3%
1980	502		−7.0%
1990	414		−17.5%
2000	261		−37.0%
2010	348		33.3%
2020	314		−9.8%
U.S. Decennial Census

=== 2010 census ===
As of the census of 2010, there were 348 people, 99 households, and 59 families living in the city. The population density was 570.5 inhabitants per square mile (220.3/km^{2}). There were 118 housing units at an average density of 193.4 per square mile (74.7/km^{2}). The racial makeup of the city was 95.1% White, 2.6% African American, 1.4% Native American, and 0.9% from two or more races. Hispanic or Latino of any race were 2.9% of the population.

There were 99 households, of which 30.3% had children under the age of 18 living with them, 47.5% were married couples living together, 8.1% had a female householder with no husband present, 4.0% had a male householder with no wife present, and 40.4% were non-families. 34.3% of all households were made up of individuals, and 18.2% had someone living alone who was 65 years of age or older. The average household size was 2.28 and the average family size was 3.03.

The median age in the city was 34.2 years. 17.8% of residents were under the age of 18; 12.1% were between the ages of 18 and 24; 34.2% were from 25 to 44; 22.4% were from 45 to 64; and 13.5% were 65 years of age or older. The gender makeup of the city was 60.1% male and 39.9% female.

=== 2000 census ===
As of the census of 2000, there were 261 people, 120 households, and 75 families living in the city. The population density was 194.5 inhabitants per square mile (75.1/km^{2}). There were 134 housing units at an average density of 99.8 per square mile (38.5/km^{2}). The racial makeup of the city was 98.85% White, 0.38% Asian, and 0.77% from two or more races. Hispanic or Latino of any race were 1.53% of the population.

There were 120 households, out of which 32.5% had children under the age of 18 living with them, 44.2% were married couples living together, 15.0% had a female householder with no husband present, and 37.5% were non-families. 35.0% of all households were made up of individuals, and 15.8% had someone living alone who was 65 years of age or older. The average household size was 2.18 and the average family size was 2.80.

In the city the population was spread out, with 25.7% under the age of 18, 9.6% from 18 to 24, 23.4% from 25 to 44, 22.6% from 45 to 64, and 18.8% who were 65 years of age or older. The median age was 41 years. For every 100 females, there were 78.8 males. For every 100 females age 18 and over, there were 79.6 males.

The median income for a household in the city was $30,500, and the median income for a family was $41,875. Males had a median income of $23,750 versus $18,125 for females. The per capita income for the city was $20,779. About 20.3% of families and 26.3% of the population were below the poverty line, including 42.5% of those under the age of eighteen and 19.6% of those 65 or over.

== Education ==
It is in the Pattonsburg R-II School District.

== See also ==
- List of cities in Missouri
