= Sugar Creek Township, Harrison County, Missouri =

Township in Harrison County, Missouri, U.S.

Sugar Creek Township
- Township
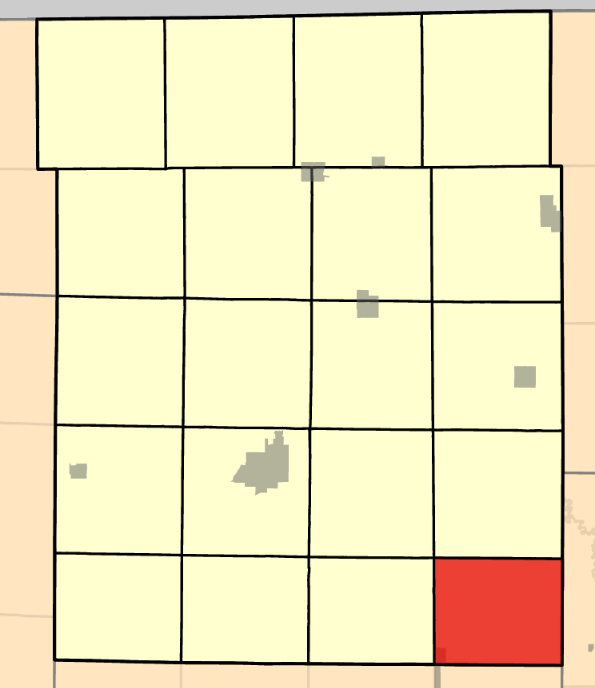
- Coordinates: 40°10′10″N 93°49′15″W
- Country: United States
- State: Missouri
- County: Harrison

Area
  - Total: 30.34 sq mi (78.6 km^{2})
  - Land: 30.34 sq mi (78.6 km^{2})
  - Water: 0.0 sq mi (0 km^{2}) 0.0%
- Elevation: 932 ft (284 m)

Population (2020)
  - Total: 440
  - Density: 14.5/sq mi (5.6/km^{2})
- FIPS code: 29-08171350
- GNIS feature ID: 766728

Sugar Creek Township is a township in Harrison County, Missouri, United States. At the 2020 census, its population was 440.

Sugar Creek Township was created in June 1845 and took its name from Sugar Creek.
