= Sherman Township, Harrison County, Missouri =

Township in Harrison County, Missouri, U.S.

Sherman Township
- Township
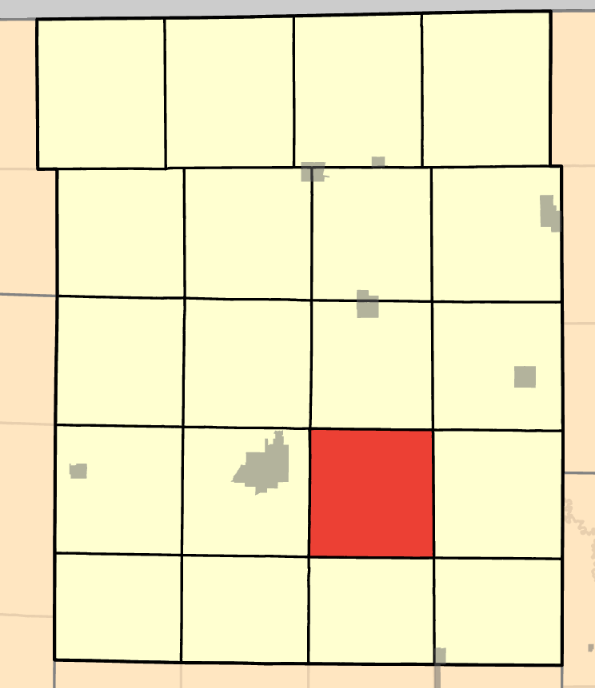
- Coordinates: 40°14′35″N 93°55′40″W
- Country: United States
- State: Missouri
- County: Harrison

Area
  - Total: 35.15 sq mi (91.0 km^{2})
  - Land: 35.06 sq mi (90.8 km^{2})
  - Water: 0.09 sq mi (0.23 km^{2}) 0.26%
- Elevation: 994 ft (303 m)

Population (2020)
  - Total: 176
  - Density: 5/sq mi (1.9/km^{2})
- FIPS code: 29-08167448
- GNIS feature ID: 766727

Sherman Township is a township in Harrison County, Missouri, United States. At the 2020 census, its population was 176.

Sherman Township was created due to a county-wide November 1872 election, which would subdivide the county into 20 municipal townships corresponding with the county's 20 congressional townships.
