= Colfax Township, Harrison County, Missouri =

Township in Harrison County, Missouri, U.S.

Colfax Township
- Township
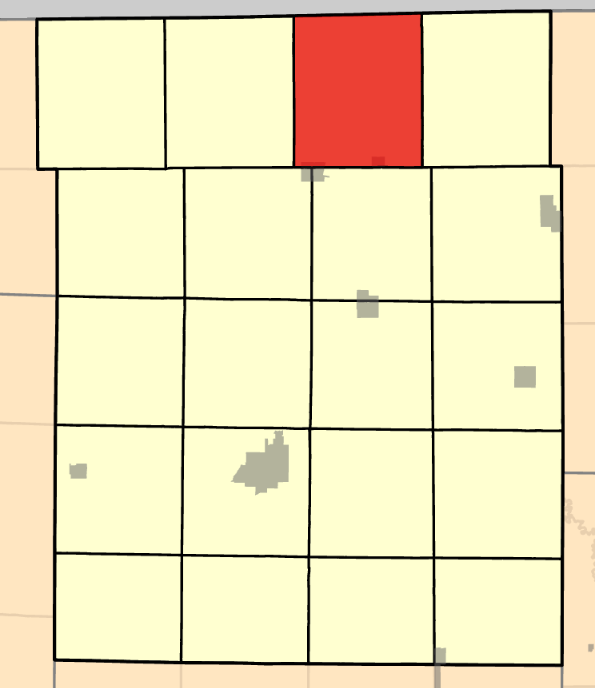
- Coordinates: 40°30′18″N 93°56′43″W
- Country: United States
- State: Missouri
- County: Harrison

Area
  - Total: 43.02 sq mi (111.4 km^{2})
  - Land: 42.69 sq mi (110.6 km^{2})
  - Water: 0.33 sq mi (0.85 km^{2}) 0.77%
- Elevation: 1,102 ft (336 m)

Population (2020)
  - Total: 599
  - Density: 14/sq mi (5.4/km^{2})
- FIPS code: 29-08115508
- GNIS feature ID: 766717

Colfax Township is a township in Harrison County, Missouri, United States. At the 2020 census, its population was 599.

Colfax township was created due to a county-wide November 1872 election, which would subdivide the county into 20 municipal townships corresponding with the county's 20 congressional townships.
