= Southwest Trafficway =

Arterial street in Kansas City, Missouri

Southwest Trafficway is a major north/south road that runs in Kansas City, Missouri from 27th Street & I-35 to 43rd Street at Madison Avenue and Belleview Avenue.

Southwest Trafficway connects Downtown Kansas City to Westport and Country Club Plaza. Left turns are prohibited at nearly every intersection by discouraging local traffic while reducing delays due to vehicles waiting to turn left.

== History ==
There was once a pedestrian tunnel under Southwest Trafficway at 40th Terrace, but it was removed as a blighted "dark alley" as part of the construction of the current intersection. In 2008, a team from UMKC analyzed the entirety of Southwest Trafficway and forwarded several proposals which would facilitate pedestrian traffic where the trafficway currently disrupts Westport, including moving the trafficway underground and planting a park at the surface.
