= Blythedale, Missouri =

- Village
- Location of Blythedale, Missouri
- Coordinates: 40°28′31″N 93°55′37″W
- Country: United States
- State: Missouri
- County: Harrison

Area
  - Total: 0.31 sq mi (0.80 km^{2})
  - Land: 0.31 sq mi (0.79 km^{2})
  - Water: 0 sq mi (0.00 km^{2})
- Elevation: 1,076 ft (328 m)

Population (2020)
  - Total: 211
  - Density: 687.6/sq mi (265.47/km^{2})
- Time zone: UTC-6 (Central (CST))
  - Summer (DST): UTC-5 (CDT)
- ZIP code: 64426
- Area code: 660
- FIPS code: 29-06742
- GNIS feature ID: 2398146

Blythedale is a village in northeast Harrison County, Missouri, United States. The population was 211 at the 2020 census.

== History ==
Blythedale was laid out in 1880, and named in honor of a railroad employee. A post office called Blythedale has been in operation since 1880.

== Geography ==
Blythedale is located at the intersection of Missouri routes N and T approximately 2.5 miles east of Interstate 35. Eagleville is approximately three mile to the west and Ridgeway is six miles south. The East Fork of Big Creek flows past the west side of the community.

According to the United States Census Bureau, the village has a total area of 0.31 square miles (0.80 km^{2}), all land.

== Demographics ==
Historical population
Census	Pop.	Note	%±
1900	315		—
1910	345		9.5%
1920	294		−14.8%
1930	253		−13.9%
1940	266		5.1%
1950	238		−10.5%
1960	179		−24.8%
1970	213		19.0%
1980	219		2.8%
1990	130		−40.6%
2000	233		79.2%
2010	193		−17.2%
2020	211		9.3%
U.S. Decennial Census

=== 2010 census ===
As of the census of 2010, there were 193 people, 86 households, and 56 families residing in the village. The population density was 622.6 inhabitants per square mile (240.4/km^{2}). There were 105 housing units at an average density of 338.7 per square mile (130.8/km^{2}). The racial makeup of the village was 100.0% White. Hispanic or Latino of any race were 2.6% of the population.

There were 86 households, of which 29.1% had children under the age of 18 living with them, 47.7% were married couples living together, 9.3% had a female householder with no husband present, 8.1% had a male householder with no wife present, and 34.9% were non-families. 32.6% of all households were made up of individuals, and 17.4% had someone living alone who was 65 years of age or older. The average household size was 2.24 and the average family size was 2.75.

The median age in the village was 43.5 years. 23.8% of residents were under the age of 18; 5.7% were between the ages of 18 and 24; 22.2% were from 25 to 44; 25.9% were from 45 to 64; and 22.3% were 65 years of age or older. The gender makeup of the village was 52.3% male and 47.7% female.

=== 2000 census ===
As of the census of 2000, there were 233 people, 100 households, and 67 families residing in the village. The population density was 754.3 inhabitants per square mile (291.2/km^{2}). There were 111 housing units at an average density of 359.3 per square mile (138.7/km^{2}). The racial makeup of the village was 99.14% White, 0.43% Pacific Islander, and 0.43% from two or more races. Hispanic or Latino of any race were 1.29% of the population.

There were 100 households, out of which 30.0% had children under the age of 18 living with them, 48.0% were married couples living together, 8.0% had a female householder with no husband present, and 33.0% were non-families. 29.0% of all households were made up of individuals, and 22.0% had someone living alone who was 65 years of age or older. The average household size was 2.33 and the average family size was 2.76.

In the village, the population was spread out, with 26.2% under the age of 18, 8.2% from 18 to 24, 26.6% from 25 to 44, 19.7% from 45 to 64, and 19.3% who were 65 years of age or older. The median age was 38 years. For every 100 females, there were 109.9 males. For every 100 females age 18 and over, there were 97.7 males.

The median income for a household in the village was $25,417, and the median income for a family was $27,500. Males had a median income of $25,000 versus $13,438 for females. The per capita income for the village was $11,281. About 26.8% of families and 32.4% of the population were below the poverty line, including 53.8% of those under the age of eighteen and 18.9% of those 65 or over.

== Education ==
It is in the North Harrison R-III School District
