= Pleasant Ridge, Indiana =

Pleasant Ridge is the name of the following places in the U.S. state of Indiana:
