= Hatfield, Missouri =

Unincorporated community in Missouri, U.S.

Coordinates: 40°31′44″N 94°09′18″W

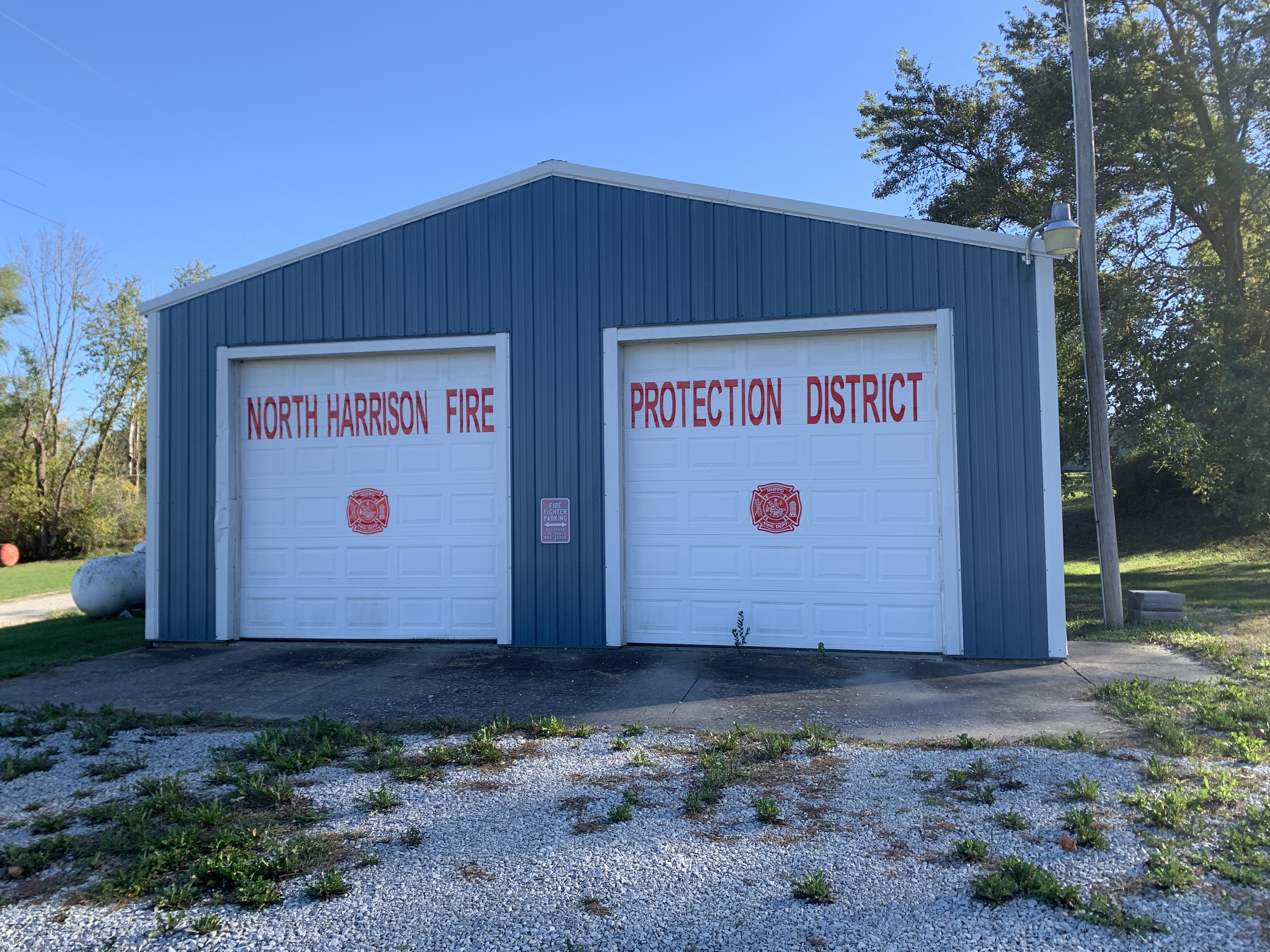
North Harrison Fire District building in Hatfield

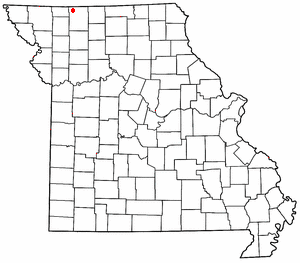

Hatfield is an unincorporated community in northwestern Harrison County, Missouri, United States. It is located approximately twelve miles east of Grant City on Route 46.

A post office called Hatfield was established in 1878, and remained in operation until 1986. The etymology of Hatfield is unknown.
