= Pawnee Township =

Pawnee Township may refer to:

- Pawnee Township, Sangamon County, Illinois
- Pawnee Township, Bourbon County, Kansas
- Pawnee Township, Pawnee County, Kansas, in Pawnee County, Kansas
- Pawnee Township, Smith County, Kansas, in Smith County, Kansas
- Pawnee Township, Platte County, Missouri
