= Union Township, Harrison County, Missouri =

Township in Harrison County, Missouri, U.S.

Union Township
- Township
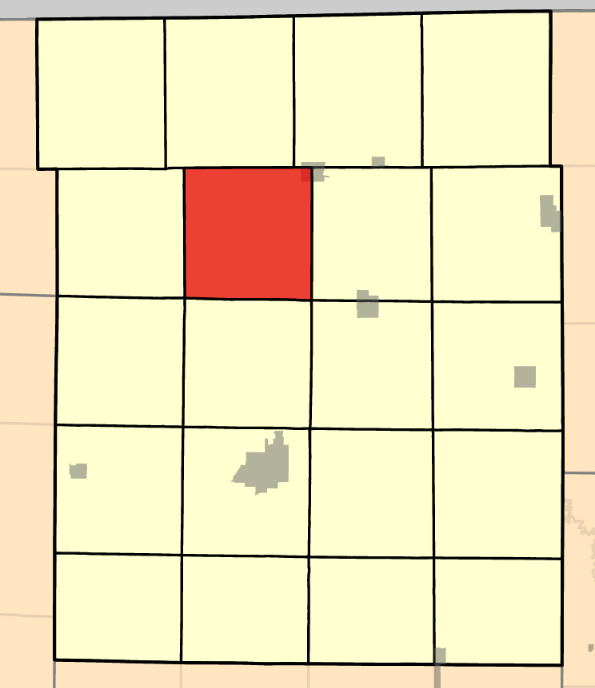
- Coordinates: 40°26′19″N 94°02′32″W
- Country: United States
- State: Missouri
- County: Harrison

Area
  - Total: 36.91 sq mi (95.6 km^{2})
  - Land: 36.7 sq mi (95 km^{2})
  - Water: 0.21 sq mi (0.54 km^{2}) 0.57%
- Elevation: 919 ft (280 m)

Population (2020)
  - Total: 388
  - Density: 10.6/sq mi (4.1/km^{2})
- FIPS code: 29-08174662
- GNIS feature ID: 766730

Union Township is a township in Harrison County, Missouri, United States. At the 2020 census, its population was 388.

Union Township was erected in 1858. The township was named for the federal union, since a large share of the residents were pro-Union during the Civil War.
