= Ridgeway, Missouri =

- City
- Location of Ridgeway, Missouri
- Coordinates: 40°22′41″N 93°56′13″W
- Country: United States
- State: Missouri
- County: Harrison

Area
  - Total: 1.22 sq mi (3.17 km^{2})
  - Land: 1.22 sq mi (3.15 km^{2})
  - Water: 0.0077 sq mi (0.02 km^{2})
- Elevation: 1,056 ft (322 m)

Population (2020)
  - Total: 372
  - Density: 305.7/sq mi (118.04/km^{2})
- Time zone: UTC-6 (Central (CST))
  - Summer (DST): UTC-5 (CDT)
- ZIP code: 64481
- Area code: 660
- FIPS code: 29-61904
- GNIS feature ID: 2396375
- Website: cityofridgewaymo.com

Ridgeway is a city in Harrison County, Missouri, United States. The population was 372 at the 2020 census.

== History ==
Ridgeway was originally called "Yankee Ridge". A post office called Yankee Ridge was established in 1872, and the name was changed to Ridgeway in 1880. The present name honors an employee of the Chicago, Burlington and Quincy Railroad.

== Geography ==
Ridgeway is located at the intersection of Missouri routes A and T 2.5 miles east of I-35. Bethany is approximately 7 miles to the south. The East Fork of Big Creek flows past about two miles west of the community.

According to the United States Census Bureau, the city has a total area of 1.23 square miles (3.19 km^{2}), of which 1.22 sq mi (3.16 km^{2}) is land and 0.01 sq mi (0.03 km^{2}) is water.

== Demographics ==
Historical population
| Census | Pop. | Note | %± |
|---|---|---|---|
| 1890 | 351 | | — |
| 1900 | 736 | | 109.7% |
| 1910 | 841 | | 14.3% |
| 1920 | 812 | | −3.4% |
| 1930 | 676 | | −16.7% |
| 1940 | 675 | | −0.1% |
| 1950 | 560 | | −17.0% |
| 1960 | 470 | | −16.1% |
| 1970 | 469 | | −0.2% |
| 1980 | 516 | | 10.0% |
| 1990 | 379 | | −26.6% |
| 2000 | 530 | | 39.8% |
| 2010 | 464 | | −12.5% |
| 2020 | 372 | | −19.8% |
U.S. Decennial Census

=== 2010 census ===
As of the census of 2010, there were 464 people, 197 households, and 123 families residing in the town. The population density was 380.3 inhabitants per square mile (146.8/km^{2}). There were 242 housing units at an average density of 198.4 per square mile (76.6/km^{2}). The racial makeup of the city was 98.5% White, 0.2% African American, 0.2% Native American, 0.6% Asian, and 0.4% from two or more races. Hispanic or Latino of any race were 0.9% of the population.

There were 197 households, of which 32.5% had children under the age of 18 living with them, 48.2% were married couples living together, 9.6% had a female householder with no husband present, 4.6% had a male householder with no wife present, and 37.6% were non-families. 31.0% of all households were made up of individuals, and 17.8% had someone living alone who was 65 years of age or older. The average household size was 2.36 and the average family size was 2.97.

The median age in the city was 42.2 years. 26.3% of residents were under the age of 18; 6.7% were between the ages of 18 and 24; 20.2% were from 25 to 44; 24.3% were from 45 to 64; and 22.4% were 65 years of age or older. The gender makeup of the city was 46.6% male and 53.4% female.

=== 2000 census ===
As of the census of 2000, there were 530 people, 221 households, and 146 families residing in the city. The population density was 464.5 inhabitants per square mile (179.3/km^{2}). There were 261 housing units at an average density of 228.8 per square mile (88.3/km^{2}). The racial makeup of the city was 97.55% White, 0.94% Native American, 0.57% Asian, and 0.94% from two or more races. Hispanic or Latino of any race were 2.08% of the population.

There were 221 households, out of which 26.7% had children under the age of 18 living with them, 52.0% were married couples living together, 8.1% had a female householder with no husband present, and 33.5% were non-families. 29.4% of all households were made up of individuals, and 16.7% had someone living alone who was 65 years of age or older. The average household size was 2.40 and the average family size was 2.92.

In the city the population was spread out, with 24.0% under the age of 18, 10.6% from 18 to 24, 20.6% from 25 to 44, 24.3% from 45 to 64, and 20.6% who were 65 years of age or older. The median age was 42 years. For every 100 females, there were 101.5 males. For every 100 females age 18 and over, there were 95.6 males.

The median income for a household in the city was $19,844, and the median income for a family was $26,250. Males had a median income of $27,500 versus $16,094 for females. The per capita income for the city was $12,551. About 17.1% of families and 22.7% of the population were below the poverty line, including 28.7% of those under age 18 and 11.5% of those age 65 or over.

== Education ==
It is in the Ridgeway R-V School District

== Notable person ==
- Clark Franklin Rinehart, U.S. Navy pilot who died in the Battle of the Coral Sea and was honored by having the USS Rinehart (DE-196) named after him
