= Mount Moriah, Missouri =

Village in Missouri, United States (Unincorporated)

- Village
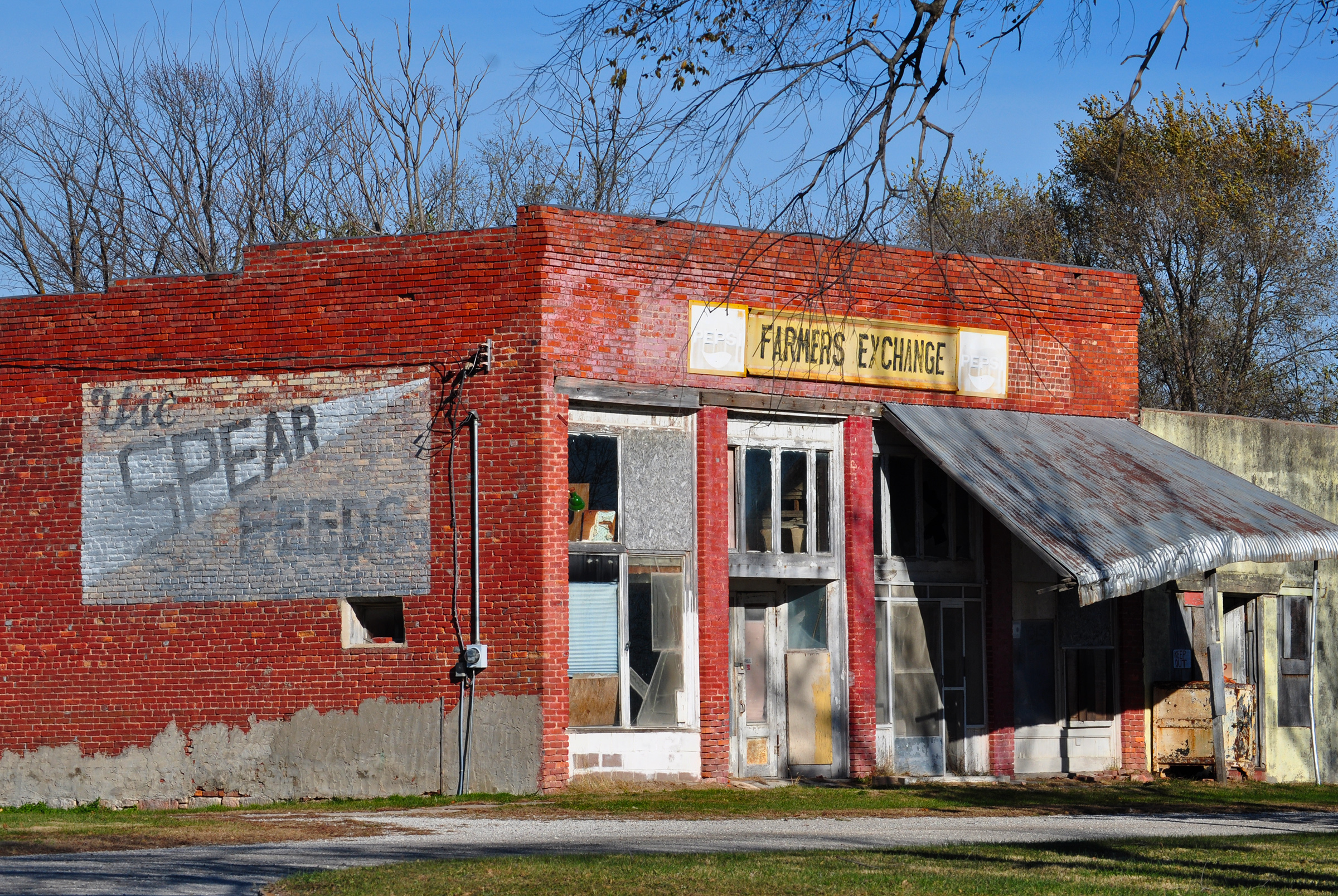
- Old Farmers Exchange building

- Location of Mount Moriah, Missouri
- Coordinates: 40°19′45″N 93°47′49″W
- Country: United States
- State: Missouri
- County: Harrison

Area
  - Total: 1.02 sq mi (2.64 km^{2})
  - Land: 1.02 sq mi (2.64 km^{2})
  - Water: 0 sq mi (0.00 km^{2})
- Elevation: 837 ft (255 m)

Population (2020)
  - Total: 75
  - Density: 73.5/sq mi (28.39/km^{2})
- Time zone: UTC-6 (Central (CST))
  - Summer (DST): UTC-5 (CDT)
- ZIP code: 64481
- Area code: 660
- FIPS code: 29-50528
- GNIS feature ID: 2396791

Mount Moriah is a village in eastern Harrison County, Missouri, United States. The population at the 2020 census was 75.

== History ==
A post office called Mount Moriah was established in 1867, and remained in operation until 1983. The name most likely was named after Moriah, a place mentioned in the Hebrew Bible.

== Geography ==
Mount Moriah is located on the west side of the Thompson River floodplain on the northwest side of U.S. Route 136. Bethany lies about fifteen miles to the southwest along route 136 and Princeton lies approximately ten miles to the east-northeast on route 136 in Mercer County.

According to the United States Census Bureau, the village has a total area of 1.02 square miles (2.64 km^{2}), all land.

== Demographics ==
Historical population
| Census | Pop. | Note | %± |
|---|---|---|---|
| 1880 | 103 | | — |
| 1900 | 412 | | — |
| 1910 | 350 | | −15.0% |
| 1920 | 331 | | −5.4% |
| 1930 | 275 | | −16.9% |
| 1940 | 276 | | 0.4% |
| 1950 | 260 | | −5.8% |
| 1960 | 225 | | −13.5% |
| 1970 | 165 | | −26.7% |
| 1980 | 162 | | −1.8% |
| 1990 | 104 | | −35.8% |
| 2000 | 143 | | 37.5% |
| 2010 | 87 | | −39.2% |
| 2020 | 75 | | −13.8% |
U.S. Decennial Census

=== 2010 census ===
As of the census of 2010, there were 87 people, 43 households, and 19 families residing in the village. The population density was 85.3 inhabitants per square mile (32.9/km^{2}). There were 69 housing units at an average density of 67.6 per square mile (26.1/km^{2}). The racial makeup of the village was 100.0% White. Hispanic or Latino of any race were 4.6% of the population.

There were 43 households, of which 18.6% had children under the age of 18 living with them, 32.6% were married couples living together, 4.7% had a female householder with no husband present, 7.0% had a male householder with no wife present, and 55.8% were non-families. 39.5% of all households were made up of individuals, and 20.9% had someone living alone who was 65 years of age or older. The average household size was 2.02 and the average family size was 2.84.

The median age in the village was 49.3 years. 18.4% of residents were under the age of 18; 1% were between the ages of 18 and 24; 24.1% were from 25 to 44; 32.1% were from 45 to 64; and 24.1% were 65 years of age or older. The gender makeup of the village was 56.3% male and 43.7% female.

=== 2000 census ===
As of the census of 2000, there were 143 people, 55 households, and 40 families residing in the town. The population density was 139.7 inhabitants per square mile (53.9/km^{2}). There were 67 housing units at an average density of 65.4 per square mile (25.3/km^{2}). The racial makeup of the town was 95.80% White, 0.70% Native American, and 3.50% from two or more races.

There were 55 households, out of which 32.7% had children under the age of 18 living with them, 52.7% were married couples living together, 12.7% had a female householder with no husband present, and 25.5% were non-families. 21.8% of all households were made up of individuals, and 16.4% had someone living alone who was 65 years of age or older. The average household size was 2.60 and the average family size was 3.02.

In the town the population was spread out, with 29.4% under the age of 18, 6.3% from 18 to 24, 25.2% from 25 to 44, 18.2% from 45 to 64, and 21.0% who were 65 years of age or older. The median age was 34 years. For every 100 females, there were 107.2 males. For every 100 females age 18 and over, there were 98.0 males.

The median income for a household in the town was $24,063, and the median income for a family was $28,750. Males had a median income of $25,000 versus $18,750 for females. The per capita income for the town was $9,346. There were 13.6% of families and 12.2% of the population living below the poverty line, including 9.4% of under eighteens and 22.5% of those over 64.

== Education ==
It is in the South Harrison County R-II School District
