= Gilman City, Missouri =

- City
- Location of Gilman City, Missouri
- Coordinates: 40°07′52″N 93°52′26″W
- Country: United States
- State: Missouri
- Counties: Harrison, Daviess

Area
  - Total: 0.84 sq mi (2.18 km^{2})
  - Land: 0.84 sq mi (2.18 km^{2})
  - Water: 0 sq mi (0.00 km^{2})
- Elevation: 981 ft (299 m)

Population (2020)
  - Total: 329
  - Density: 391.2/sq mi (151.04/km^{2})
- Time zone: UTC-6 (Central (CST))
  - Summer (DST): UTC-5 (CDT)
- ZIP code: 64642
- Area code: 660
- FIPS code: 29-27064
- GNIS feature ID: 2394901

Gilman City is a city in southeastern Harrison County and extending into northeastern Daviess County in the U.S. state of Missouri. The population was 329 at the 2020 census.

== History ==
Gilman City was platted in 1897 when the railroad was extended to that point. A post office called Gilman City has been in operation since 1897. The city has the name of Theodore Gilman, a railroad banker. The city would continue to grow up until the removal of the railroad, which led to the slow decline of the town.

== Geography ==
Gilman City is located on Missouri Route 146 approximately eleven miles southeast of Bethany and 16 northwest of Trenton, Missouri. The community of Melbourne is 4.5 miles to the east.

According to the United States Census Bureau, the city has a total area of 0.84 square miles (2.18 km^{2}), all land.

== Demographics ==
Historical population
Census	Pop.	Note	%±
1900	447		—
1910	537		20.1%
1920	618		15.1%
1930	535		−13.4%
1940	555		3.7%
1950	450		−18.9%
1960	379		−15.8%
1970	376		−0.8%
1980	414		10.1%
1990	393		−5.1%
2000	380		−3.3%
2010	383		0.8%
2020	329		−14.1%
U.S. Decennial Census

=== 2010 census ===
As of the census of 2010, there were 383 people, 156 households, and 108 families living in the city. The population density was 456.0 inhabitants per square mile (176.1/km^{2}). There were 196 housing units at an average density of 233.3 per square mile (90.1/km^{2}). The racial makeup of the city was 99.5% White and 0.5% from two or more races. Hispanic or Latino of any race were 0.8% of the population.

There were 156 households, of which 35.9% had children under the age of 18 living with them, 53.2% were married couples living together, 7.7% had a female householder with no husband present, 8.3% had a male householder with no wife present, and 30.8% were non-families. 25.6% of all households were made up of individuals, and 12.2% had someone living alone who was 65 years of age or older. The average household size was 2.46 and the average family size was 2.93.

The median age in the city was 35.6 years. 26.1% of residents were under the age of 18; 9.9% were between the ages of 18 and 24; 24.4% were from 25 to 44; 25% were from 45 to 64; and 14.6% were 65 years of age or older. The gender makeup of the city was 48.8% male and 51.2% female.

=== 2000 census ===
As of the census of 2000, there were 380 people, 158 households, and 100 families living in the city. The population density was 444.9 inhabitants per square mile (171.8/km^{2}). There were 207 housing units at an average density of 242.3 per square mile (93.6/km^{2}). The racial makeup of the city was 99.47% White, and 0.53% from two or more races. Hispanic or Latino of any race were 0.53% of the population.

There were 158 households, out of which 31.0% had children under the age of 18 living with them, 53.8% were married couples living together, 7.0% had a female householder with no husband present, and 36.1% were non-families. 31.6% of all households were made up of individuals, and 19.0% had someone living alone who was 65 years of age or older. The average household size was 2.41 and the average family size was 3.03.

In the city the population was spread out, with 26.1% under the age of 18, 12.1% from 18 to 24, 22.4% from 25 to 44, 19.7% from 45 to 64, and 19.7% who were 65 years of age or older. The median age was 36 years. For every 100 females, there were 91.0 males. For every 100 females age 18 and over, there were 95.1 males.

The median income for a household in the city was $26,042, and the median income for a family was $33,482. Males had a median income of $21,518 versus $16,250 for females. The per capita income for the city was $12,413. About 4.0% of families and 9.8% of the population were below the poverty line, including 3.5% of those under age 18 and 13.3% of those age 65 or over.

== Education ==
It is in the Gilman City R-IV School District.
