= Missouri Route 146 =

State highway in Missouri, U.S.

Route 146
- MO 146 highlighted in red

Route information
- Maintained by MoDOT
- Length: 27.739 mi (44.642 km)

Major junctions
- West end: US 136 east of Bethany
- East end: Route 6 / Route W west of Trenton

Location
- Country: United States
- State: Missouri

Highway system
- Missouri State Highway System; Interstate; US; State; Supplemental
← Route 145	→ Route 147

Route 146 is a highway in northern Missouri. Its eastern terminus is at Route 6 west of Trenton; its western terminus is at U.S. Route 136 east of Bethany.

== Major intersections ==
County	Location	mi	km	Destinations	Notes
Harrison	Sherman Township	0.000	0.000	US 136 – Bethany, Mount Moriah	
Grundy	Madison Township	24.650	39.670	Route 190 east – Jamesport	
Grundy	Madison Township	26.598	42.805	Route 128 north – Crowder State Park	
Grundy	Madison Township	27.739	44.642	Route 6 – Trenton, Jamesport; Route W – Hickory	Roadway continues as Route W
1.000 mi = 1.609 km; 1.000 km = 0.621 mi
