= Eagleville, Missouri =

- Village
- Motto: A small town with a big tomorrow!
- Location of Eagleville, Missouri
- Coordinates: 40°28′06″N 93°59′10″W
- Country: United States
- State: Missouri
- County: Harrison

Area
  - Total: 1.02 sq mi (2.64 km^{2})
  - Land: 1.01 sq mi (2.62 km^{2})
  - Water: 0.0077 sq mi (0.02 km^{2})
- Elevation: 1,096 ft (334 m)

Population (2020)
  - Total: 275
  - Density: 272.3/sq mi (105.13/km^{2})
- Time zone: UTC-6 (Central (CST))
  - Summer (DST): UTC-5 (CDT)
- ZIP code: 64442
- Area code: 660
- FIPS code: 29-20674
- GNIS feature ID: 2396915
- Website: http://www.eagleville.com/

Eagleville is a village in northern Harrison County, Missouri, United States. The population was 275 at the 2020 census.

== History ==
Eagleville was originally called Eagle, and under the latter name was platted in 1851. A post office called Eagle was established in 1853, and the name was changed to Eagleville in 1881.

== Geography ==
Eagleville is located on U.S. Route 69 just west of I-35 and approximately 14 miles north of Bethany the county seat of Harrison County. Blythedale is three miles to the east on Missouri Route N.

According to the United States Census Bureau, the village has a total area of 1.02 square miles (2.64 km^{2}), of which 1.01 square miles (2.62 km^{2}) is land and 0.01 square miles (0.03 km^{2}) is water.

== Demographics ==
Historical population
Census	Pop.	Note	%±
1880	453		—
1890	305		−32.7%
1900	292		−4.3%
1910	330		13.0%
1920	340		3.0%
1930	305		−10.3%
1940	353		15.7%
1950	360		2.0%
1960	341		−5.3%
1970	388		13.8%
1980	364		−6.2%
1990	275		−24.5%
2000	321		16.7%
2010	316		−1.6%
2020	275		−13.0%
U.S. Decennial Census

=== 2010 census ===
As of the census of 2010, there were 316 people, 131 households, and 81 families living in the village. The population density was 312.9 inhabitants per square mile (120.8/km^{2}). There were 149 housing units at an average density of 147.5 per square mile (57.0/km^{2}). The racial makeup of the village was 98.1% White, 0.3% African American, 0.3% Native American, and 1.3% from two or more races. Hispanic or Latino of any race were 1.6% of the population.

There were 131 households, of which 30.5% had children under the age of 18 living with them, 51.1% were married couples living together, 7.6% had a female householder with no husband present, 3.1% had a male householder with no wife present, and 38.2% were non-families. 32.1% of all households were made up of individuals, and 16.1% had someone living alone who was 65 years of age or older. The average household size was 2.41 and the average family size was 3.10.

The median age in the village was 40 years. 27.8% of residents were under the age of 18; 5.7% were between the ages of 18 and 24; 23.5% were from 25 to 44; 19.7% were from 45 to 64; and 23.4% were 65 years of age or older. The gender makeup of the village was 47.8% male and 52.2% female.

=== 2000 census ===
As of the census of 2000, there were 321 people, 143 households, and 95 families living in the town. The population density was 314.8 inhabitants per square mile (121.5/km^{2}). There were 155 housing units at an average density of 152.0 per square mile (58.7/km^{2}). The racial makeup of the town was 97.82% White, 0.62% Native American, 0.31% from other races, and 1.25% from two or more races. Hispanic or Latino of any race were 1.25% of the population.

There were 143 households, out of which 29.4% had children under the age of 18 living with them, 54.5% were married couples living together, 9.8% had a female householder with no husband present, and 32.9% were non-families. 30.8% of all households were made up of individuals, and 16.1% had someone living alone who was 65 years of age or older. The average household size was 2.24 and the average family size was 2.74.

In the town the population was spread out, with 22.4% under the age of 18, 7.5% from 18 to 24, 24.9% from 25 to 44, 21.2% from 45 to 64, and 24.0% who were 65 years of age or older. The median age was 42 years. For every 100 females, there were 84.5 males. For every 100 females age 18 and over, there were 81.8 males.

The median income for a household in the town was $24,821, and the median income for a family was $29,250. Males had a median income of $21,406 versus $16,250 for females. The per capita income for the town was $15,299. About 14.8% of families and 17.4% of the population were below the poverty line, including 3.4% of those under age 18 and 31.3% of those age 65 or over.

== Education ==
It is in the North Harrison R-III School District
