= Sugar Creek (Thompson River tributary) =

Stream in the US state of Missouri

Coordinates: 40.127233°N 93.688832°W

Sugar Creek is a stream in Grundy and Harrison Counties in the U.S. state of Missouri. It is a tributary of the Thompson River.

Sugar Creek was so named on account of the sugar maple timber lining its course.

== See also ==
- List of rivers of Missouri
