= Harrison County, Missouri =

County in Missouri, United States

- County
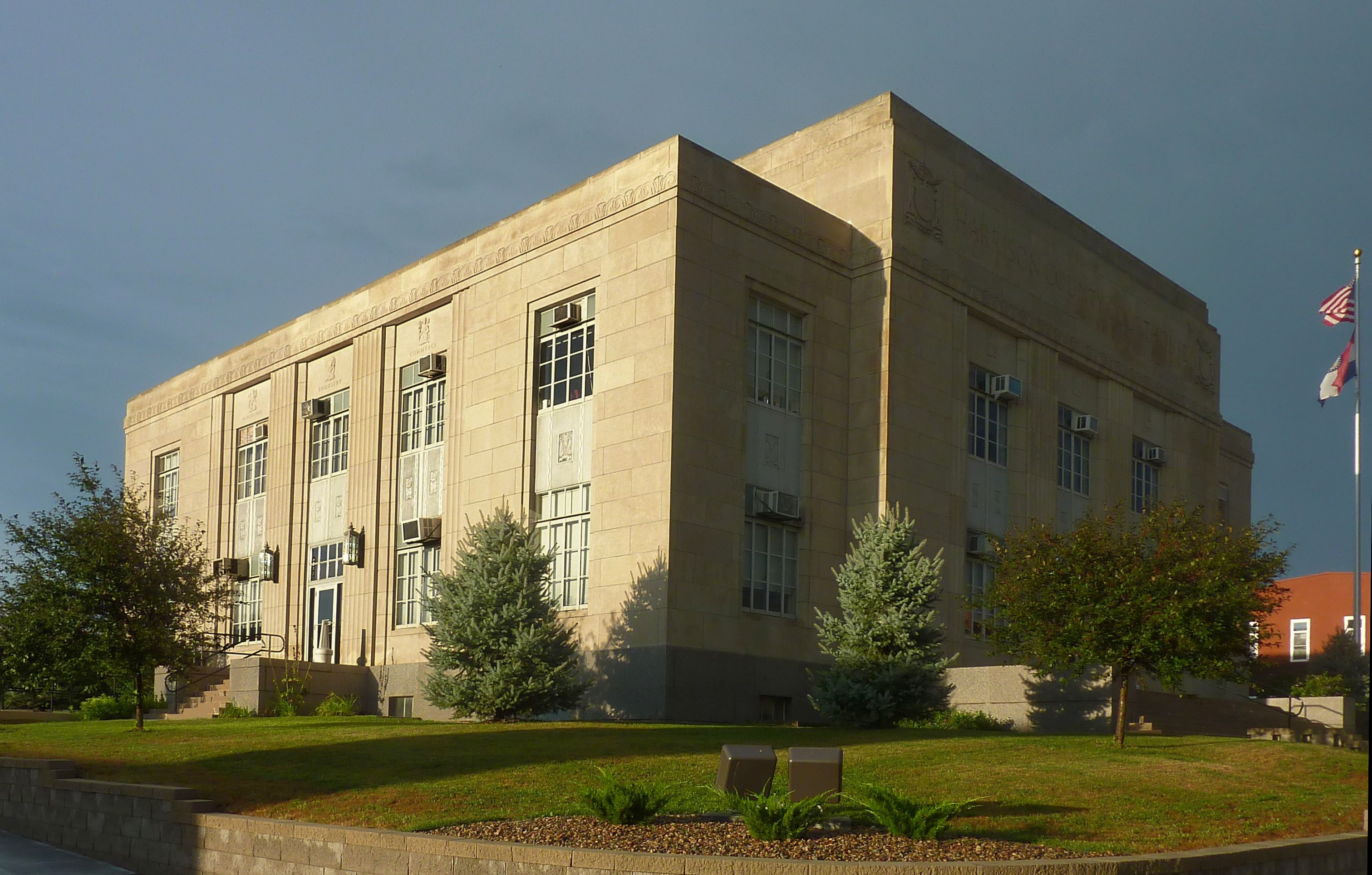
- Harrison County Courthouse in Bethany

- Location within the U.S. state of Missouri
- Coordinates: 40°21′N 93°59′W
- Country: United States
- State: Missouri
- Founded: February 14, 1845
- Named for: Albert G. Harrison
- Seat: Bethany
- Largest city: Bethany

Area
  - Total: 726 sq mi (1,880 km^{2})
  - Land: 723 sq mi (1,870 km^{2})
  - Water: 3.9 sq mi (10 km^{2}) 0.5%

Population (2020)
  - Total: 8,157
  - Estimate (2025): 8,281 ▲
  - Density: 11.5/sq mi (4.4/km^{2})
- Time zone: UTC−6 (Central)
  - Summer (DST): UTC−5 (CDT)
- Congressional district: 6th
- Website: https://www.mocounties.com/harrison-county

Harrison County is a county located in the northwest portion of the U.S. state of Missouri. As of the 2020 census, the population was 8,157. Its county seat is Bethany. The county was organized February 14, 1845, and named for U.S. Representative Albert G. Harrison of Missouri.

== Geography ==
According to the U.S. Census Bureau, the county has a total area of 726 square miles (1,880 km^{2}), of which 723 square miles (1,870 km^{2}) is land and 3.9 square miles (10 km^{2}) (0.5%) is water.

=== Adjacent counties ===
- Ringgold County, Iowa (north)
- Decatur County, Iowa (northeast)
- Mercer County (east)
- Grundy County (southeast)
- Daviess County (south)
- Gentry County (southwest)
- Worth County (northwest)

=== Major highways ===
- Interstate 35
- U.S. Route 69
- U.S. Route 136
- Route 13
- Route 46
- Route 146

=== Transit ===
- Jefferson Lines

== Demographics ==
Historical population
Census	Pop.	Note	%±
1850	2,447		—
1860	10,601		333.2%
1870	14,635		38.1%
1880	20,304		38.7%
1890	21,033		3.6%
1900	24,398		16.0%
1910	20,466		−16.1%
1920	19,719		−3.6%
1930	17,233		−12.6%
1940	16,525		−4.1%
1950	14,107		−14.6%
1960	11,603		−17.8%
1970	10,257		−11.6%
1980	9,890		−3.6%
1990	8,469		−14.4%
2000	8,850		4.5%
2010	8,957		1.2%
2020	8,157		−8.9%
2025 (est.)	8,281	▲	1.5%

=== 2020 census ===
As of the 2020 census, the county had a population of 8,157, and the median age was 42.8 years. 23.5% of residents were under the age of 18 and 23.3% were 65 years of age or older. For every 100 females there were 98.9 males, and for every 100 females age 18 and over there were 96.0 males age 18 and over.

The racial makeup of the county was 94.1% White, 0.5% Black or African American, 0.6% American Indian and Alaska Native, 0.3% Asian, 0.1% Native Hawaiian and Pacific Islander, 0.8% from some other race, and 3.7% from two or more races. Hispanic or Latino residents of any race comprised 2.1% of the population.

0.0% of residents lived in urban areas, while 100.0% lived in rural areas.

There were 3,403 households in the county, of which 27.9% had children under the age of 18 living with them and 24.8% had a female householder with no spouse or partner present. About 31.1% of all households were made up of individuals and 16.0% had someone living alone who was 65 years of age or older.

There were 4,019 housing units, of which 15.3% were vacant. Among occupied housing units, 73.0% were owner-occupied and 27.0% were renter-occupied. The homeowner vacancy rate was 2.7% and the rental vacancy rate was 11.4%.

=== Racial and ethnic composition ===
Harrison County, Missouri – Racial and ethnic composition Note: the US Census treats Hispanic/Latino as an ethnic category. This table excludes Latinos from the racial categories and assigns them to a separate category. Hispanics/Latinos may be of any race.
Race / Ethnicity (NH = Non-Hispanic)	Pop 1980	Pop 1990	Pop 2000	Pop 2010	Pop 2020	% 1980	% 1990	% 2000	% 2010	% 2020
White alone (NH)	9,811	8,374	8,654	8,659	7,618	99.20%	98.88%	97.79%	96.67%	93.39%
Black or African American alone (NH)	0	8	12	28	32	0.00%	0.09%	0.14%	0.31%	0.39%
Native American or Alaska Native alone (NH)	16	31	20	28	30	0.16%	0.37%	0.23%	0.31%	0.37%
Asian alone (NH)	18	17	13	16	23	0.18%	0.20%	0.15%	0.18%	0.28%
Native Hawaiian or Pacific Islander alone (NH)	x	x	5	9	3	x	x	0.06%	0.10%	0.04%
Other race alone (NH)	0	2	0	6	10	0.00%	0.02%	0.00%	0.07%	0.12%
Mixed race or Multiracial (NH)	x	x	57	70	273	x	x	0.64%	0.78%	3.35%
Hispanic or Latino (any race)	45	37	89	141	168	0.46%	0.44%	1.01%	1.57%	2.06%
Total	9,890	8,469	8,850	8,957	8,157	100.00%	100.00%	100.00%	100.00%	100.00%

=== 2010 census ===
As of the 2010 census, there were 8,957 people, 3,669 households and 2,461 families residing in the county. The population density was 12 people per square mile (4.6 people/km^{2}). There were 4,407 housing units at an average density of 6 units per square mile (2.3/km^{2}). The racial makeup of the county was 97.55% White, 0.36% Native American, 0.33% Black or African American, 0.20% Asian, 0.10% Pacific Islander, 0.52% from other races and 0.93% from two or more races. Approximately 1.57% of the population were Hispanic or Latino of any race.

There were 3,669 households, out of which 29.79% had children under the age of 18 living with them, 54.51% were married couples living together, 8.29% had a female householder with no husband present and 32.92% were non-families. 28.26% of all households were made up of individuals, and 14.31% had someone living alone who was 65 years of age or older. The average household size was 2.40 and the average family size was 2.93.

In the county, the population was spread out, with 24.80% under the age of 18, 7.18% from 18 to 24, 20.88% from 25 to 44, 26.44% from 45 to 64 and 20.70% who were 65 years of age or older. The median age was 42.6 years. For every 100 females there were 98.47 males. For every 100 females age 18 and over, there were 93.79 males.

The median income for a household in the county was $35,000 and the median income for a family was $47,788. Males had a median income of $33,105 versus $25,388 for females. The per capita income for the county was $18,967. About 10.3% of families and 15.1% of the population were below the poverty line, including 18.9% of those under age 18 and 13.8% of those age 65 or over.

=== Religion ===
According to the Association of Religion Data Archives County Membership Report (2010), evangelical Protestantism is the most common religion among adherents in Harrison County, although 37.69% of the population does not claim any religion. The most predominant denominations among residents in Harrison County who adhere to a religion are Southern Baptists (44.11%), United Methodists (10.77%) and Disciples of Christ (10.76%).

== Education ==
School districts include:

- Cainsville R-I School District
- Gilman City R-IV School District
- North Daviess R-III School District
- North Harrison R-III School District
- Ridgeway R-V School District
- South Harrison County R-II School District

=== Public schools ===
- Cainsville R-I School District - Cainsville
  - Cainsville Elementary School (PK-06)
  - Cainsville High School (07–12)
- Gilman City R-IV School District - Gilman City
  - Gilman City Elementary School (PK-06)
  - Gilman City High School (07–12)
- North Harrison County R-III School District - Eagleville
  - North Harrison County Elementary School (PK-05)
  - North Harrison County High School (06–12)
- Ridgeway R-V School District - Ridgeway
  - Ridgeway Elementary School (PK-06)
  - Ridgeway High School (07–12)
- South Harrison County R-II School District - Bethany
  - South Harrison County Early Childhood Educational Center (PK)
  - South Harrison County Elementary School (K-06)
  - South Harrison County High School (07–12)

=== Private schools ===
- Zadie Creek School - Eagleville (02–09) - Amish

=== Public libraries ===
- Bethany Public Library

== Communities ==
=== Cities ===
- Bethany (county seat)
- Cainsville
- Gilman City
- New Hampton
- Ridgeway

=== Villages ===
- Blythedale
- Eagleville
- Mount Moriah

=== Unincorporated communities ===
- Akron
- Andover
- Blue Ridge
- Bolton
- Brooklyn
- Hatfield
- Martinsville
- Matkins
- Melbourne
- Mitchellville
- Pawnee
- Pleasant Ridge
- Washington Center

=== Townships ===
- Adams
- Bethany
- Butler
- Clay
- Colfax
- Cypress
- Dallas
- Fox Creek
- Grant
- Hamilton
- Jefferson
- Lincoln
- Madison
- Marion
- Sherman
- Sugar Creek
- Trail Creek
- Union
- Washington
- White Oak

== Notable people ==
- Babe Adams - MLB pitcher (1906–1926)
- Leonard Boswell - Politician
- Frank Buckles - Last surviving American veteran of World War I
- Jesse N. Funk - World War I Medal of Honor recipient
- Tyler Luellen - University of Missouri Football 2003–2007

== Politics ==
=== Local ===
The Republican Party controls politics at the local level in Harrison County. Republicans hold all of the elected positions in the county.

Harrison County, Missouri

Elected countywide officials
Assessor	Lila Mae Craig	Republican
Circuit Clerk	C. Sherece Eivins	Republican
County Clerk	Greta Bottcher	Republican
Collector	Cheryl Coleman	Republican
Commissioner (presiding)	Jack W. Hodge	Republican
Commissioner (district 1)	Rick J. Smith	Republican
Commissioner (district 2)	Jim Holcomb	Republican
Coroner	Zach Wilson	Republican
Prosecuting Attorney	Alex VanZandt	Republican
Public Administrator	Kimberly King	Republican
Recorder	C. Sherece Eivins	Republican
Sheriff	Trevor Place	Republican
Surveyor	Edgar Lawrence	Republican
Treasurer	Cheryl Coleman	Republican

=== State ===
Past gubernatorial elections results
Year	Republican	Democratic	Third Parties
2024	85.19% 3,243	13.92% 530	0.90% 34
2020	82.61% 3,139	15.84% 602	1.55% 59
2016	67.50% 2,473	29.50% 1,081	3.00 110
2012	56.78% 2,072	39.82% 1,453	3.40% 124
2008	54.06% 2,090	43.87% 1,696	2.07% 80
2004	63.53% 2,556	35.22% 1,417	1.25% 50
2000	60.16% 2,307	37.29% 1,430	2.55% 98
1996	39.36% 1,472	58.82% 2,200	1.82% 68

All of Harrison County is a part of Missouri's 2nd District in the Missouri House of Representatives and is currently represented by J. Eggleston (R-Maysville). Eggleston was reelected to a fourth term in 2020.

Missouri House of Representatives – District 2 – Harrison County (2020)
Party	Candidate	Votes	%	±%
Republican	J. Eggleston	3,253	86.82%	−13.18
Democratic	Mindi Smith	494	13.18%	+13.18

Missouri House of Representatives – District 2 – Harrison County (2018)
Party	Candidate	Votes	%	±%
Republican	J. Eggleston	2,520	100.00%	±0.00

All of Harrison County is a part of Missouri's 12th District in the Missouri Senate and is currently represented by Dan Hegeman (R-Cosby). Hegeman won a second term in 2018.

Missouri Senate – District 12 – Harrison County (2018)
Party	Candidate	Votes	%	±%
Republican	Dan Hegeman	2,328	82.52%	−17.48
Democratic	Terry Richard	493	17.48%	+17.48%

Missouri Senate — District 12 — Harrison County (2014)
Party	Candidate	Votes	%	±%
Republican	Dan Hegeman	2,051	100.00	

=== Federal ===
All of Harrison County is included in Missouri's 6th Congressional District and is currently represented by Sam Graves (R-Tarkio) in the U.S. House of Representatives. Graves was elected to an eleventh term in 2020 over Democratic challenger Gena Ross.

U.S. House of Representatives – Missouri’s 6th Congressional District – Harrison County (2020)
Party	Candidate	Votes	%	±%
Republican	Sam Graves	3,250	85.80%	+3.41
Democratic	Gena L. Ross	496	13.09%	−1.90
Libertarian	Jim Higgins	42	1.11%	−1.51

U.S. House of Representatives – Missouri's 6th Congressional District – Harrison County (2018)
Party	Candidate	Votes	%	±%
Republican	Sam Graves	2,358	82.39%	+1.55
Democratic	Henry Robert Martin	429	14.99%	−0.90
Libertarian	Dan Hogan	75	2.62%	+0.39

Harrison County, along with the rest of the state of Missouri, is represented in the U.S. Senate by Josh Hawley (R-Columbia) and Eric Schmitt (R-Clayton).

U.S. Senate – Class I – Harrison County (2018)
Party	Candidate	Votes	%	±%
Republican	Josh Hawley	2,155	74.93%	+26.73
Democratic	Claire McCaskill	611	21.25%	−21.81
Independent	Craig O'Dear	61	2.12%	
Libertarian	Japheth Campbell	37	1.29%	−7.44
Green	Jo Crain	12	0.42%	+0.42

Blunt was elected to a second term in 2016 over then-Missouri Secretary of State Jason Kander.

U.S. Senate — Class III — Harrison County (2016)
Party	Candidate	Votes	%	±%
Republican	Roy Blunt	2,415	65.89%	+17.69
Democratic	Jason Kander	1,053	28.73%	−14.33
Libertarian	Jonathan Dine	88	2.40%	−6.33
Green	Johnathan McFarland	37	1.01%	+1.01
Constitution	Fred Ryman	72	1.96%	+1.96

==== Political culture ====
United States presidential election results for Harrison County, Missouri
Year	Republican		Democratic		Third party(ies)	
Year	No.	%	No.	%	No.	%
1888	2,418	56.22%	1,722	40.04%	161	3.74%
1892	2,474	52.83%	1,630	34.81%	579	12.36%
1896	2,956	53.00%	2,582	46.30%	39	0.70%
1900	3,083	56.26%	2,209	40.31%	188	3.43%
1904	3,014	62.96%	1,596	33.34%	177	3.70%
1908	2,842	58.41%	1,938	39.83%	86	1.77%
1912	2,081	40.49%	1,985	38.62%	1,074	20.89%
1916	2,741	53.86%	2,205	43.33%	143	2.81%
1920	5,151	66.55%	2,502	32.33%	87	1.12%
1924	4,247	58.18%	2,792	38.25%	261	3.58%
1928	4,818	67.36%	2,319	32.42%	16	0.22%
1932	2,476	42.09%	3,376	57.39%	31	0.53%
1936	4,888	55.22%	3,942	44.53%	22	0.25%
1940	5,304	61.42%	3,325	38.50%	7	0.08%
1944	4,330	62.18%	2,623	37.67%	11	0.16%
1948	3,646	55.98%	2,854	43.82%	13	0.20%
1952	5,191	69.54%	2,261	30.29%	13	0.17%
1956	4,141	62.19%	2,518	37.81%	0	0.00%
1960	4,166	65.44%	2,200	34.56%	0	0.00%
1964	2,516	47.44%	2,787	52.56%	0	0.00%
1968	3,092	59.55%	1,688	32.51%	412	7.94%
1972	3,574	72.10%	1,383	27.90%	0	0.00%
1976	2,478	51.49%	2,304	47.87%	31	0.64%
1980	2,734	58.73%	1,732	37.21%	189	4.06%
1984	2,844	63.30%	1,649	36.70%	0	0.00%
1988	2,271	55.89%	1,776	43.71%	16	0.39%
1992	1,563	37.02%	1,590	37.66%	1,069	25.32%
1996	1,737	44.77%	1,628	41.96%	515	13.27%
2000	2,552	63.94%	1,328	33.27%	111	2.78%
2004	2,729	67.42%	1,279	31.60%	40	0.99%
2008	2,512	64.16%	1,287	32.87%	116	2.96%
2012	2,624	71.01%	984	26.63%	87	2.35%
2016	2,965	80.37%	574	15.56%	150	4.07%
2020	3,198	83.59%	597	15.60%	31	0.81%
2024	3,293	85.64%	534	13.89%	18	0.47%

At the presidential level, Harrison County is reliably Republican. Donald Trump carried the county easily in 2016 and 2020. Bill Clinton was the last Democratic presidential nominee to carry Harrison County in 1992. The last Democrat to win support from a majority of Harrison County voters was Lyndon Johnson in 1964.

Like most rural areas throughout northwest Missouri, voters in Harrison County generally adhere to socially and culturally conservative principles which tend to influence their Republican leanings. In 2004, Missourians voted on a constitutional amendment to define marriage as the union between a man and a woman—it overwhelmingly won in Harrison County with 81% of the vote. The initiative passed the state with 71% support from voters. In 2006, Missourians voted on a constitutional amendment to fund and legalize embryonic stem cell research in the state—it failed in Harrison County with 56% voting against the measure. The initiative narrowly passed the state with 51% of support from voters as Missouri became one of the first states in the nation to approve embryonic stem cell research. Despite Harrison County's longstanding tradition of supporting socially conservative platforms, voters in the county have a penchant for advancing populist causes like increasing the minimum wage. In 2006, Missourians voted on a proposition (Proposition B) to increase the minimum wage in the state to $6.50 an hour—it passed Harrison County with 61% of the vote. The proposition strongly passed every single county in Missouri with 79% voting in favor. (During the same election, voters in five other states also strongly approved increases in the minimum wage.) In 2018, Missourians voted on a proposition (Proposition A) concerning right to work, the outcome of which ultimately reversed the right to work legislation passed in the state the previous year. 59.09% of Harrison County voters cast their ballots to overturn the law.

=== Missouri presidential preference primaries ===
==== 2020 ====
The 2020 presidential primaries for both the Democratic and Republican parties were held in Missouri on March 10. On the Democratic side, former Vice President Joe Biden (D-Delaware) both won statewide and carried Harrison County by a wide margin. Biden went on to defeat President Donald Trump in the general election.

Missouri Democratic Presidential Primary – Harrison County (2020)
Party	Candidate	Votes	%	±%
Democratic	Joe Biden	186	65.49	
Democratic	Bernie Sanders	68	23.94	
Democratic	Tulsi Gabbard	6	2.11	
Democratic	Others/Uncommitted	24	8.45	

Incumbent President Donald Trump (R-Florida) won both Harrison County and statewide by large margins. None of his primary challengers received any votes in Harrison County.

Missouri Republican Presidential Primary – Harrison County (2020)
Party	Candidate	Votes	%	±%
Republican	Donald Trump	597	98.35	
Republican	Uncommitted	10	1.65	

==== 2016 ====
The 2016 presidential primaries for both the Republican and Democratic parties were held in Missouri on March 15. Businessman Donald Trump (R-New York) narrowly won the state overall and won a plurality of the vote in Harrison County. He went on to win the presidency.

Missouri Republican Presidential Primary – Harrison County (2016)
Party	Candidate	Votes	%	±%
Republican	Donald Trump	755	46.52	
Republican	Ted Cruz	591	36.41	
Republican	John Kasich	141	8.69	
Republican	Marco Rubio	85	5.24	
Republican	Others/Uncommitted	51	3.14	

On the Democratic side, former Secretary of State Hillary Clinton (D-New York) won statewide by a small margin, but Senator Bernie Sanders (I-Vermont) narrowly carried Harrison County.

Missouri Democratic Presidential Primary – Harrison County (2016)
Party	Candidate	Votes	%	±%
Democratic	Bernie Sanders	163	50.00	
Democratic	Hillary Clinton	158	48.47	
Democratic	Others/Uncommitted	5	1.53	

==== 2012 ====
In the 2012 Missouri Republican Presidential Primary, voters in Harrison County supported former U.S. Senator Rick Santorum (R-Pennsylvania), who finished first in the state at large, but ultimately lost the nomination to former Governor Mitt Romney (R-Massachusetts). Delegates were chosen at a county caucus that ultimately selected an uncommitted delegation. Incumbent President Barack Obama easily won the Missouri Democratic Primary and renomination. He defeated Romney in the general election.

==== 2008 ====
In 2008, the Missouri Republican Presidential Primary was closely contested, with Senator John McCain (R-Arizona) prevailing and eventually winning the nomination.

Missouri Republican Presidential Primary – Harrison County (2008)
Party	Candidate	Votes	%	±%
Republican	John McCain	288	32.65	
Republican	Mike Huckabee	277	31.41	
Republican	Mitt Romney	207	23.47	
Republican	Ron Paul	93	10.54	
Republican	Others/Uncommitted	17	1.93	

Then-Senator Hillary Clinton (D-New York) received more votes than any candidate from either party in Harrison County during the 2008 presidential primary. Despite initial reports that Clinton had won Missouri, Barack Obama (D-Illinois), also a Senator at the time, narrowly defeated her statewide and later became that year's Democratic nominee, going on to win the presidency.

Missouri Democratic Presidential Primary – Harrison County (2008)
Party	Candidate	Votes	%	±%
Democratic	Hillary Clinton	436	60.81	
Democratic	Barack Obama	249	34.73	
Democratic	Others/Uncommitted	32	4.47	

== See also ==
- National Register of Historic Places listings in Harrison County, Missouri
