= Big Creek (Grand River tributary) =

Stream in the U.S. state of Missouri

Big Creek is a stream in Harrison and Daviess counties of northern Missouri. It is a tributary of the Grand River.

The source is in southwest Harrison County at the junction of the West Fork Big Creek and the East Fork Big Creek on the west side of Bethany located at 40°15′59″N 94°03′09″W at an elevation of approximately 838 ft (255 m), and its confluence with the Grand River is in northwest Daviess County approximately two miles southeast of Pattonsburg and just west of I-35 at 40°01′30″N 94°06′23″W and an elevation of 771 ft (235 m).

Big Creek most likely was named for its tendency to flood the adjacent fields following heavy rainstorms.

== See also ==
- List of rivers of Missouri
