= U.S. Route 136 in Missouri =

Segment of U.S. Highway in Missouri

U.S. Route 136
- US 136 highlighted in red

Route information
- Maintained by MoDOT
- Length: 257 mi (414 km)

Major junctions
- West end: US 136 at the Nebraska state line in Brownville, NE
- I-29 in Rock Port; US 275 in Rock Port; US 59 near Tarkio; US 71 near Burlington Junction; US 169 in Stanberry; US 69 near Bethany; I-35 in Bethany; US 65 in Princeton; US 63 near Glenwood; US 61 near Alexandria
- East end: US 61 / US 136 at the Iowa state line near Alexandria

Location
- Country: United States
- State: Missouri
- Counties: Atchison, Nodaway, Gentry, Harrison, Mercer, Putnam, Schuyler, Scotland, Clark

Highway system
- United States Numbered Highway System; List; Special; Divided; Missouri State Highway System; Interstate; US; State; Supplemental
| ← Route 135 | → Route 137 |

U.S. Highway 136 (US 136) is a part of the United States Numbered Highway System that runs for 804 miles (1,294 km) between Edison, Nebraska, and Speedway, Indiana. It is a spur route of US 36 despite never intersecting its parent. Its largest subsection is within the state of Missouri, and it begins at the Missouri River and continues east across the northernmost part of the state to the Missouri-Iowa state line near Alexandria along the banks of the Des Moines River. The highway travels across the croplands and pastures of northern Missouri to the woods of the Mississippi River Valley. For its entire length, US 136 is a two-lane highway and it encounters all nine county seats for the counties it passes through. Throughout Missouri, it intersects two Interstate Highways and eight other US Highways, and it runs concurrently with seven of the US Highways.

== Route description ==
=== Rock Port to Maryville ===
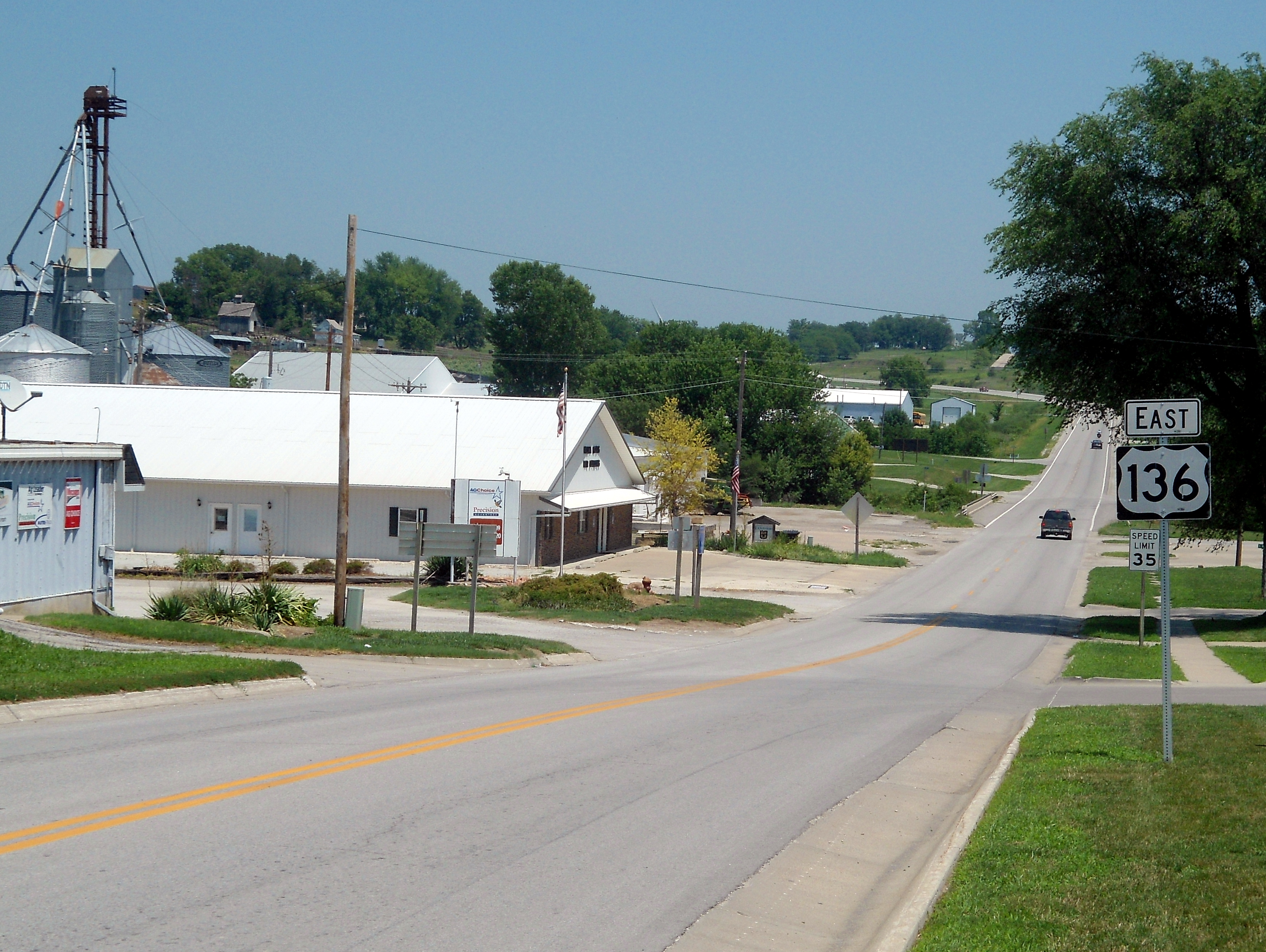
US 136 runs east in Rock Port

US 136 begins in Missouri by crossing the Missouri River at Brownville, Nebraska and traveling easterly about five miles (8.0 km) through the Missouri River bottomlands to Rock Port where it junctions with Interstate 29 (I-29). After ascending the Loess Hills, the highway intersects with the southern terminus of US 275 and consequently intersects with the northern terminus of Route 111, all within Rock Port. After leaving the town, US 136 continues east around five miles (8.0 km) to its intersection with US 59; it travels north into Tarkio after running concurrently with US 59 for 1.5 miles (2.4 km). US 136 continues east through town, while US 59 continues north into Iowa.

Next is roughly 16 miles (26 km) of easterly travel, amongst many wind turbines, until it reaches the Nodaway River. After crossing, the highways comes into Burlington Junction a mile (1.6 km) later. In Burlington Junction, the highway intersects the northern terminus of Route 113 and travels east two miles (3.2 km) to US 71. US 136 and US 71 continue concurrently from this point until Maryville in south and east spurts until reaching the east end of town where the two separate at their junction with Route 46. While circumscribing Maryville, the highway intersects US 71 Business (US 71 Bus.) and the southern terminus of Route 148.

=== Maryville to Bethany ===
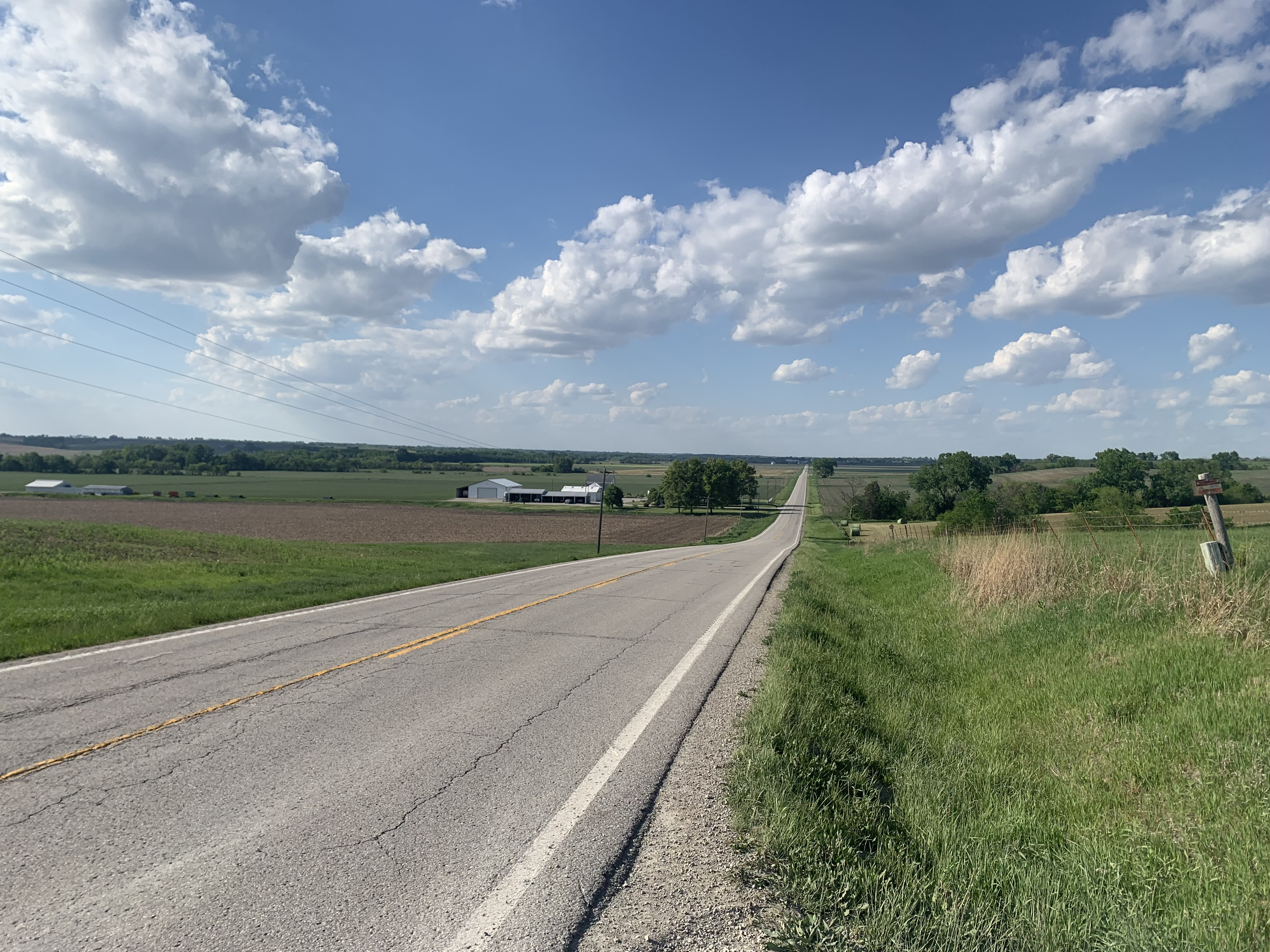
US 136 in the Platte River valley north of Conception Junction, Missouri

Leaving the east side of Maryville begins traveling concurrently with Route 46. As the highway travels east towards Ravenwood it first crosses the One Hundred and Two River, then passes south of Mozingo Lake, and finally crosses Platte River, all in the span of 9.5 miles (15.3 km). Route 46 continues northeasterly into Ravenwood while US 136 turns south and travels about five miles (8.0 km) to the Tri-C Area of Conception, Conception Junction, and Clyde. The highway makes a semi-circle splitting the three communities before heading southeasterly about eight miles (13 km) to Stanberry.

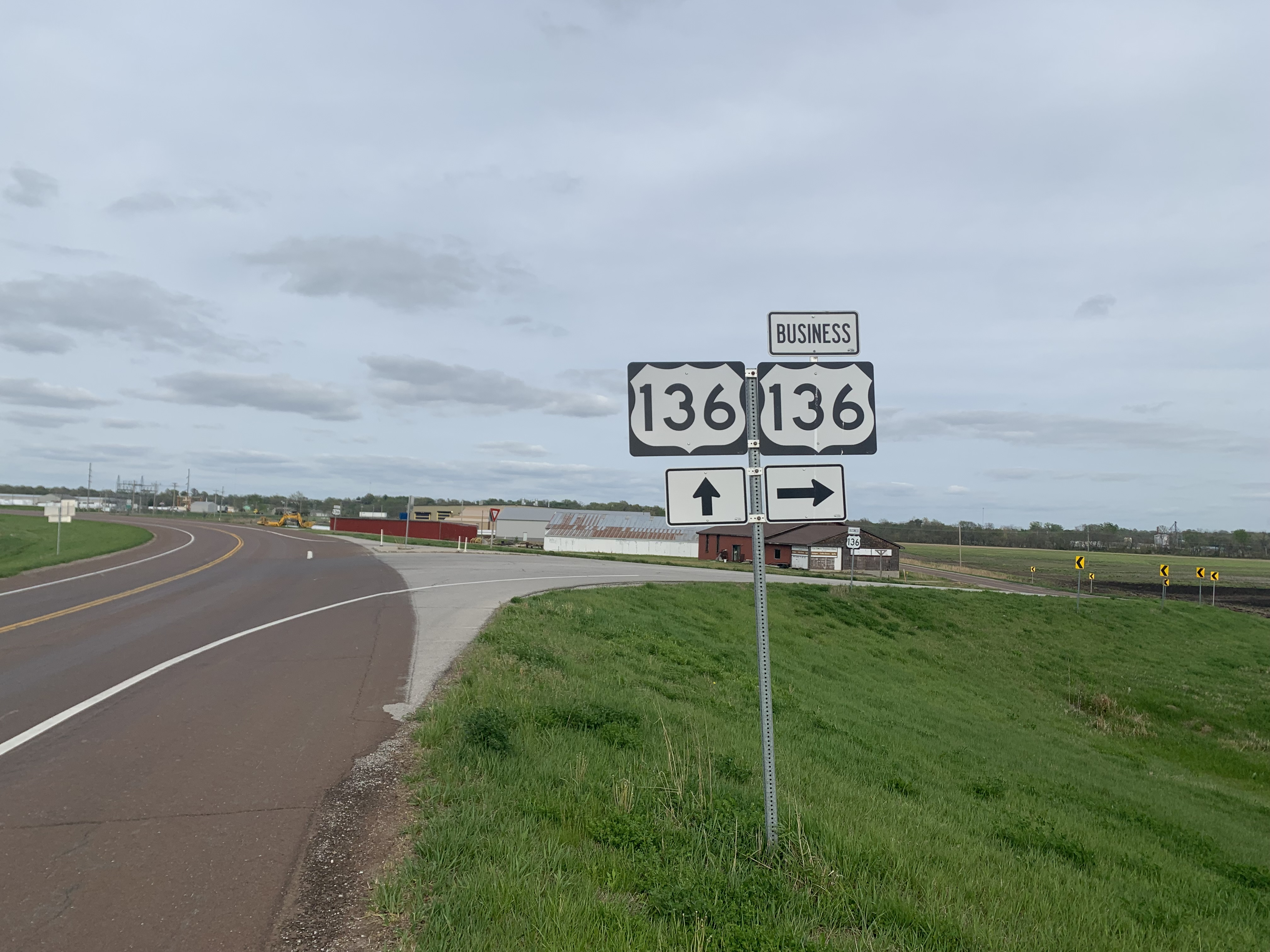
Western terminus Business US 136 in Albany, Missouri

In Stanberry, US 136 meets US 169, and together they travel north out of town about 1.7 miles (2.7 km) before curving eastward towards Albany. The highway travels 5.8 miles (9.3 km) before US 169 separates from US 136 by heading north, whereas US 136 continues east-northeast about 5.5 miles (8.9 km) before reaching the north end of Albany where it meets the northern terminus of Route 85. US 136 continues easterly seven miles (11 km) from Albany to New Hampton and then another 7.5 miles (12.1 km) from New Hampton to its junction with US 69. The highway travels concurrently eastward two miles (3.2 km) before reaching the northern terminus of Route 13 in southern Bethany. The highway turns north for 0.8 miles (1.3 km) before US 136 separates from US 69 by turning east in the center of Bethany.

=== Bethany to Lancaster ===
As US 136 leaves Bethany, the last 2,000-plus population city on its path through Missouri, it first crosses I-35, the last Interstate it will cross until central Illinois, then it continues east another 3.3 miles (5.3 km) before reaching the northern terminus of Route 146. The rest of the highway's travels in Missouri will be less dense with intersections and settlements than the preceding 100 miles (160 km). US 136 continues east, then northeast about 11 miles (18 km) before reaching Mt. Moriah. From there, US 136 travels another 10 miles (16 km) or so before reaching the southern terminus of Route 145 nearby Lake Paho and then continues about four miles (6.4 km) east to Princeton. In Princeton, the highway meets US 65 and travels concurrently for 1/3 mile (0.54 km) then leaves the town to its east and travels northeasterly about eight miles (13 km) before reaching Ravanna. From there, it travels approximately eight miles (13 km) easterly to the northern terminus of Route 139 and then passes north of the village of Lucerne almost 15 miles (24 km) to Unionville.

On the west end of Unionville, US 136 joins Route 5 and runs concurrently north then east through the town about a mile (1.6 km) before Route 5 separates and travels north out of town. Then the highway travels about 1.8 miles (2.9 km) out of Unionville to the east and reaches Route 129 and travels with it about a mile before Route 129 separates and continues south. US 136 continues about 8.1 miles (13.0 km) easterly until the northern terminus of Route 149 then it runs around 6.3 miles (10.1 km) northeasterly to Livonia. Leaving there, the highway continues almost eight miles (13 km) to its intersection with US 63 where they both run concurrently about 2.1 miles (3.4 km) until the eastern terminus of Route 202 where they separate with US 136 directing itself east into the town of Lancaster.

=== Lancaster to Alexandria ===
Leaving Lancaster to the east, US 136 travels around 10.5 miles (16.9 km) to Downing; at one point on that stretch, the highway was only about 4.6 miles (7.4 km) from the Sullivan Line of the Iowa-Missouri border. Continuing southeasterly about 10 miles (16 km) the highway junctions with the northern terminus of Route 15 a mile (1.6 km) west of Memphis. After sweeping south of Memphis, US 136 continues easterly 16 miles (26 km) to the village of Luray, then another six miles (9.7 km) southeasterly later it passes by Medill, before reaching Kahoka after about four miles (6.4 km) more. In southern Kahoka, Route 81 junctions with the highway, then US 136 travels two miles (3.2 km) east, three miles (4.8 km) southeast, and then three miles (4.8 km) northeast before arriving at Wayland. Afterward, it crosses Route 27, before traveling 2.5 miles (4.0 km) east and around four miles (6.4 km) southeast where it meets US 61. Then it runs concurrently with US 61, passes by Alexandria, and after 2.4 miles (3.9 km) crosses the Des Moines River and enters Iowa just west of Keokuk, Iowa.

== Major intersections ==
| County | Location | mi | km | Destinations | Notes |
|---|---|---|---|---|---|
| Atchison | Templeton Township | 0.000 | 0.000 | US 136 west – Brownville | Continuation into Nebraska via a Missouri River crossing |
| Atchison | Templeton Township | 2.025 | 3.259 | Route D – Watson | |
| Atchison | Phelps City | 2.875 | 4.627 | Route U – Langdon | |
| Atchison | Rock Port | 5.265– 5.286 | 8.473– 8.507 | I-29 – St. Joseph, Council Bluffs, Iowa | I-29 exit 110 |
| Atchison | Clay Township | 6.743 | 10.852 | US 275 – Hamburg, Iowa | Access to Star School Hill Prairie Conservation Area |
| Atchison | Rock Port | 7.971 | 12.828 | Route 111 | |
| Atchison | Clay Township | 9.874 | 15.891 | Route Y | |
| Atchison | Clay Township | 10.779 | 17.347 | Route J – Fairfax | |
| Atchison | Tarkio Township | 14.355 | 23.102 | US 59 – Fairfax | Western end of US 59 concurrency; access to Fairfax Community Hospital |
| Atchison | Tarkio | 15.791 | 25.413 | US 59 – Shenandoah, Iowa | Eastern end of US 59 concurrency; access to Tarkio Technology Institute |
| Atchison | Tarkio Township | 16.794 | 27.027 | Route O – Westboro | Access to Gould Peterson Municipal Airport |
| Atchison | Colfax Township | 21.844 | 35.155 | Route N – Mound City | |
| Atchison | Colfax Township | 22.848 | 36.770 | Route M – Blanchard, Iowa | |
| Atchison | Colfax Township | 25.880 | 41.650 | Route YY | |
| Nodaway | Lincoln Township | 30.007 | 48.292 | Route KK – Elmo | |
| Nodaway | Lincoln Township | 30.265 | 48.707 | Route PP | Access to Bilby Ranch Lake Conservation Area |
| Nodaway | Burlington Junction | 33.052 | 53.192 | Route 113 (South Ballard Street) – Quitman | |
| Nodaway | Nodaway Township | 35.143 | 56.557 | US 71 north – Clearmont | Northern end of US 71 concurrency |
| Nodaway | Nodaway Township | 37.602 | 60.515 | Route AB | |
| Nodaway | Polk Township | 42.952 | 69.125 | Route FF | |
| Nodaway | Polk Township | 46.083 | 74.163 | Route CC / US 71 Bus. – Maryville | Access to Northwest Missouri State University |
| Nodaway | Polk Township | 47.283 | 76.095 | Route 148 – Pickering | Access to Nodaway County Community Lake |
| Nodaway | Maryville | 49.398 | 79.498 | Route 46 (East First Street) / US 71 south – St. Joseph | Southern end of US 71 concurrency; western end of Route 46 concurrency; access to Northwest Missouri State University |
| Nodaway | Polk Township | 52.237 | 84.067 | Route EE / Route F | |
| Nodaway | Jackson Township | 56.238 | 90.506 | Route E / Route MM | |
| Nodaway | Jackson Township | 58.769 | 94.580 | Route 46 east – Ravenwood | Eastern end of Route 46 concurrency |
| Nodaway | Jefferson Township | 63.634 | 102.409 | Route P – Clyde | Access to Benedictine Sisters of Perpetual Adoration |
| Nodaway | Jefferson Township | 64.173 | 103.276 | Route T – Conception Junction | |
| Nodaway | Conception | 65.703 | 105.739 | Route VV | Access to Conception Abbey |
| Nodaway | Jefferson Township | 66.490 | 107.005 | Route J | |
| Nodaway | Jefferson Township | 66.665 | 107.287 | Route P – Clyde | Access to Benedictine Sisters of Perpetual Adoration |
| Gentry | Cooper Township | 73.563 | 118.388 | Route W | |
| Gentry | Stanberry | 74.535 | 119.952 | US 169 south (North Alanthus Avenue) – King City | Southern end of US 169 concurrency |
| Gentry | Cooper Township | 76.232 | 122.684 | Route B – Alanthus Grove | |
| Gentry | Huggins Township | 79.162 | 127.399 | Route F | |
| Gentry | Huggins Township | 82.075 | 132.087 | Route H / US 169 north – Darlington, Gentry | Northern end of US 169 concurrency |
| Gentry | Athens Township | 84.520 | 136.022 | US 136 Bus. – Albany | |
| Gentry | Albany | 87.539 | 140.880 | Route C / Route 85 – Allendale | |
| Harrison | New Hampton | 94.857 | 152.658 | Route EE | |
| Harrison | New Hampton | 95.329 | 153.417 | Route ZZ – McFall | |
| Harrison | White Oak Township | 96.955 | 156.034 | Route D – Martinsville | |
| Harrison | White Oak Township | 98.971 | 159.278 | Route BB | |
| Harrison | Bethany Township | 102.239 | 164.538 | US 69 south – Pattonsburg | Northern end of US 69 concurrency |
| Harrison | Bethany | 104.119 | 167.563 | Route 13 – Coffey | |
| Harrison | Bethany | 104.894 | 168.811 | US 69 north – Eagleville | Southern end of US 69 concurrency |
| Harrison | Bethany | 105.632– 105.650 | 169.998– 170.027 | I-35 – Des Moines, Iowa, Kansas City | I-29 exit 92 |
| Harrison | Sherman Township | 108.967 | 175.365 | Route 146 – Gilman City | |
| Harrison | Sherman Township | 109.972 | 176.983 | Route T – Ridgeway | |
| Harrison | Sherman Township | 112.736 | 181.431 | Route OO | |
| Harrison | Fox Creek Township | 115.412 | 185.738 | Route CC | |
| Harrison | Mount Moriah | 119.352 | 192.078 | Route B | |
| Mercer | Madison Township | 122.358 | 196.916 | Route D – Modena | |
| Mercer | Madison Township | 123.582 | 198.886 | Route CC | |
| Mercer | Harrison Township | 127.442 | 205.098 | Route A / Route B – Modena | |
| Mercer | Morgan Township | 129.577 | 208.534 | Route 145 | Access to Lake Paho Conservation Area |
| Mercer | Morgan Township | 129.755 | 208.820 | Route U | |
| Mercer | Morgan Township | 130.289 | 209.680 | Route P | |
| Mercer | Princeton | 132.623 | 213.436 | Route FF (North Fullerton Street) | |
| Mercer | Princeton | 133.064 | 214.146 | US 65 north (College Avenue) – Mercer | Northern end of US 65 concurrency |
| Mercer | Princeton | 133.392 | 214.674 | US 65 south – Spickard | Southern end of US 65 concurrency |
| Mercer | Ravanna | 140.792 | 226.583 | Route C | |
| Mercer | Ravanna | 141.014 | 226.940 | Route W | |
| Mercer | Ravanna Township | 143.098 | 230.294 | Route DD | |
| Mercer | Ravanna Township | 144.857 | 233.125 | Route Z | |
| Mercer | Ravanna Township | 145.860 | 234.739 | Route O | |
| Putnam | Medicine Township | 148.639 | 239.211 | Route 139 south – Newtown | Southern end of Route 139 concurrency |
| Putnam | Medicine Township | 149.996 | 241.395 | Route NN – Lucerne | |
| Putnam | Medicine Township | 150.514 | 242.229 | Route A – Lucerne | |
| Putnam | Medicine Township | 152.020 | 244.652 | Route C / Route 139 north – Sewal, Iowa | Northern end of Route 139 concurrency |
| Putnam | York Township | 153.462 | 246.973 | Route N | |
| Putnam | Jackson Township | 157.382 | 253.282 | Route E / Route EE – Powersville | |
| Putnam | Jackson Township | 161.296 | 259.581 | Route H | |
| Putnam | Union Township | 162.846 | 262.075 | Route U – Seymour, Iowa | |
| Putnam | Wilson Township | 164.967 | 265.489 | Route 5 south – Lemons | Southern end of Route 5 concurrency |
| Putnam | Unionville | 165.883 | 266.963 | Route 5 north (22nd Street) – Cincinnati, Iowa | Northern end of Route 5 concurrency; access to Lake Thurderhead |
| Putnam | Lincoln Township | 167.641 | 269.792 | Route 129 north – Cincinnati, Iowa | Northern end of Route 129 concurrency |
| Putnam | Richland Township | 168.524 | 271.213 | Route 129 south – Green City | Southern end of Route 129 concurrency; access to Mineral Hills Conservation Area |
| Putnam | Lincoln Township | 168.739 | 271.559 | Route Y | |
| Putnam | Richland Township | 171.975 | 276.767 | Route W – Martinstown | |
| Putnam | Elm Township | 175.186 | 281.935 | Route YY – Hartford | |
| Putnam | Elm Township | 176.617 | 284.238 | Route V / Route 149 south | Southern end of Route 149 concurrency |
| Putnam | Liberty Township | 178.907 | 287.923 | Route 149 north – Exline, Iowa | Northern end of Route 149 concurrency |
| Putnam | Grant Township | 181.286 | 291.752 | Route FF | |
| Putnam | Grant Township | 182.805 | 294.196 | Route N (1st Street) – Livonia | |
| Schuyler | Glenwood Township | 184.911 | 297.585 | Route H / Route F | |
| Schuyler | Glenwood Township | 186.874 | 300.745 | Route AA – Glenwood | |
| Schuyler | Liberty Township | 190.635 | 306.797 | US 63 south – Queen City | Southern end of US 63 concurrency |
| Schuyler | Lancaster | 192.754 | 310.207 | Route 202 / US 63 north – Coatsville, Bloomfield, Iowa | Northern end of US 63 concurrency |
| Schuyler | Lancaster | 193.655 | 311.658 | Route U | |
| Schuyler | Lancaster | 193.747 | 311.806 | Route C | |
| Schuyler | Downing | 203.150 | 326.938 | Route N | |
| Schuyler | Downing | 203.495 | 327.493 | Route V | |
| Schuyler | Downing | 203.651 | 327.745 | Route A | |
| Scotland | Vest Township | 209.080 | 336.482 | Route B | |
| Scotland | Jefferson Township | 213.762 | 344.017 | Route 15 south – Edina | Southern end of Route 15 concurrency |
| Scotland | Memphis | 214.711 | 345.544 | Route 15 south / US 136 Bus. west – Milton, Iowa | Northern end of Route 15 concurrency |
| Scotland | Memphis | 215.146 | 346.244 | US 136 Bus. east | |
| Scotland | Memphis | 215.444 | 346.724 | Route MM | |
| Scotland | Jefferson Township | 219.433 | 353.143 | Route U | |
| Scotland | Thomson Township | 223.155 | 359.133 | Route A / Route H – South Gorin, Arbela | |
| Scotland | Thomson Township | 225.912 | 363.570 | Route F – Granger | |
| Clark | Wyaconda Township | 228.712 | 368.076 | Route A – Wyaconda | |
| Clark | Luray | 230.648 | 371.192 | Route K | |
| Clark | Wyaconda Township | 233.252 | 375.383 | Route BB | |
| Clark | Lincoln Township | 238.457 | 383.759 | US 136 Bus. east – Kahoka | |
| Clark | Kahoka | 240.001 | 386.244 | Route 81 (Johnson Street) | |
| Clark | Madison Township | 241.825 | 389.180 | US 136 Bus. west – Kahoka | |
| Clark | Wayland | 248.315 | 399.624 | US 136 Spur / South Main Street | |
| Clark | Wayland | 248.588 | 400.064 | Route B – St. Francisville | |
| Clark | Wayland | 248.869– 248.887 | 400.516– 400.545 | Route 27 north / Route 27 south to US 61 south – St. Francisville, Canton | Interchange |
| Clark | Vernon Township | 255.049 | 410.462 | US 61 south / Great River Road south | Southern end of US 61 concurrency; southern end of Great River Road concurrency |
| Clark | Vernon Township | 257.462 | 414.345 | US 136 east / US 61 north / Great River Road north – Keokuk | Continuation into Iowa via a Des Moines River crossing |
1.000 mi = 1.609 km; 1.000 km = 0.621 mi: Concurrency terminus

U.S. Route 136
| Previous state: Nebraska | Missouri | Next state: Iowa |
