= Grant Township =

Grant Township may refer to:

== Arkansas ==
- Grant Township, Johnson County, Arkansas, in Johnson County, Arkansas

== Illinois ==
- Grant Township, Lake County, Illinois
- Grant Township, Vermilion County, Illinois

== Indiana ==
- Grant Township, Benton County, Indiana
- Grant Township, DeKalb County, Indiana
- Grant Township, Greene County, Indiana
- Grant Township, Newton County, Indiana

== Iowa ==
- Grant Township, Adams County, Iowa
- Grant Township, Boone County, Iowa
- Grant Township, Buena Vista County, Iowa
- Grant Township, Carroll County, Iowa
- Grant Township, Cass County, Iowa
- Grant Township, Cerro Gordo County, Iowa
- Grant Township, Clinton County, Iowa
- Grant Township, Dallas County, Iowa
- Grant Township, Franklin County, Iowa
- Grant Township, Greene County, Iowa
- Grant Township, Grundy County, Iowa
- Grant Township, Guthrie County, Iowa
- Grant Township, Hardin County, Iowa
- Grant Township, Ida County, Iowa
- Grant Township, Kossuth County, Iowa
- Grant Township, Linn County, Iowa
- Grant Township, Lyon County, Iowa
- Grant Township, Monona County, Iowa
- Grant Township, Montgomery County, Iowa
- Grant Township, O'Brien County, Iowa
- Grant Township, Page County, Iowa
- Grant Township, Plymouth County, Iowa
- Grant Township, Pocahontas County, Iowa
- Grant Township, Poweshiek County, Iowa
- Grant Township, Ringgold County, Iowa
- Grant Township, Sioux County, Iowa
- Grant Township, Story County, Iowa
- Grant Township, Tama County, Iowa
- Grant Township, Taylor County, Iowa
- Grant Township, Union County, Iowa
- Grant Township, Winnebago County, Iowa
- Grant Township, Woodbury County, Iowa
- Grant Township, Wright County, Iowa

== Kansas ==
- Grant Township, Barton County, Kansas
- Grant Township, Clay County, Kansas
- Grant Township, Cloud County, Kansas
- Grant Township, Cowley County, Kansas
- Grant Township, Crawford County, Kansas
- Grant Township, Decatur County, Kansas
- Grant Township, Dickinson County, Kansas
- Grant Township, Douglas County, Kansas
- Grant Township, Jackson County, Kansas
- Grant Township, Jewell County, Kansas
- Grant Township, Lincoln County, Kansas
- Grant Township, Marion County, Kansas
- Grant Township, Neosho County, Kansas
- Grant Township, Osage County, Kansas
- Grant Township, Osborne County, Kansas
- Grant Township, Ottawa County, Kansas
- Grant Township, Pawnee County, Kansas
- Grant Township, Pottawatomie County, Kansas
- Grant Township, Reno County, Kansas
- Grant Township, Republic County, Kansas
- Grant Township, Riley County, Kansas
- Grant Township, Russell County, Kansas
- Grant Township, Sedgwick County, Kansas
- Grant Township, Sherman County, Kansas
- Grant Township, Washington County, Kansas

== Michigan ==
- Grant Township, Cheboygan County, Michigan
- Grant Township, Clare County, Michigan
- Grant Township, Grand Traverse County, Michigan
- Grant Township, Huron County, Michigan
- Grant Township, Iosco County, Michigan
- Grant Township, Keweenaw County, Michigan
- Grant Township, Mason County, Michigan
- Grant Township, Mecosta County, Michigan
- Grant Township, Newaygo County, Michigan
- Grant Township, Oceana County, Michigan
- Grant Township, St. Clair County, Michigan

== Missouri ==
- Grant Township, Caldwell County, Missouri
- Grant Township, Clark County, Missouri
- Grant Township, Dade County, Missouri
- Grant Township, Dallas County, Missouri
- Grant Township, DeKalb County, Missouri
- Grant Township, Harrison County, Missouri
- Grant Township, Nodaway County, Missouri
- Grant Township, Putnam County, Missouri
- Grant Township, Stone County, Missouri
- Grant Township, Webster County, Missouri

== Nebraska ==
- Grant Township, Antelope County, Nebraska
- Grant Township, Buffalo County, Nebraska
- Grant Township, Cuming County, Nebraska
- Grant Township, Custer County, Nebraska
- Grant Township, Gage County, Nebraska
- Grant Township, Kearney County, Nebraska

== North Carolina ==
- Grant Township, Randolph County, North Carolina, in Randolph County, North Carolina

== North Dakota ==
- Grant Township, Richland County, North Dakota, in Richland County, North Dakota

== Pennsylvania ==
- Grant Township, Indiana County, Pennsylvania

== South Dakota ==
- Grant Township, Beadle County, South Dakota, in Beadle County, South Dakota
- Grant Township, Lincoln County, South Dakota, in Lincoln County, South Dakota
- Grant Township, McCook County, South Dakota, in McCook County, South Dakota
- Grant Township, Roberts County, South Dakota, in Roberts County, South Dakota
