= Grant Township, Missouri =

Grant Township, Missouri may refer to one of the following 10 places in the State of Missouri:

- Grant Township, Caldwell County, Missouri
- Grant Township, Clark County, Missouri
- Grant Township, Dade County, Missouri
- Grant Township, Dallas County, Missouri
- Grant Township, DeKalb County, Missouri
- Grant Township, Harrison County, Missouri
- Grant Township, Nodaway County, Missouri
- Grant Township, Putnam County, Missouri
- Grant Township, Stone County, Missouri
- Grant Township, Webster County, Missouri

== See also ==
- Grant Township (disambiguation)
