= Grant Township, Nebraska =

Grant Township, Nebraska may refer to the following places:

- Grant Township, Antelope County, Nebraska
- Grant Township, Buffalo County, Nebraska
- Grant Township, Cuming County, Nebraska
- Grant Township, Custer County, Nebraska
- Grant Township, Gage County, Nebraska
- Grant Township, Kearney County, Nebraska

== See also ==
- Grant Township (disambiguation)
