= Glendale, Putnam County, Missouri =

Unincorporated community in Missouri, United States

Coordinates: 40°29′12″N 92°45′49″W

Glendale is an unincorporated community in eastern Putnam County, in the U.S. state of Missouri.

The community is at the intersection of US Route 136 and Missouri Route 149. Livonia is approximately four miles to the east and Unionville is about eleven miles west. Shoal Creek flows past the community.

== History ==
Glendale had its start as a post office serving a rural area. A post office called Glendale was established in 1891, and remained in operation until 1905.
