= Grant Township, Michigan =

Grant Township is the name of some places in the U.S. state of Michigan:

- Grant Township, Cheboygan County, Michigan
- Grant Township, Clare County, Michigan
- Grant Township, Grand Traverse County, Michigan
- Grant Township, Huron County, Michigan
- Grant Township, Iosco County, Michigan
- Grant Township, Keweenaw County, Michigan
- Grant Township, Mason County, Michigan
- Grant Township, Mecosta County, Michigan
- Grant Township, Newaygo County, Michigan
- Grant Township, Oceana County, Michigan
- Grant Township, St. Clair County, Michigan

== See also ==
- Grant, Michigan, a city in Newaygo County
- Grant Township (disambiguation)
