= A. H. Weatherford =

American politician

Member of the Washington House of Representatives
- In office 1889–1891

Personal details
- Born: October 10, 1853 Unionville, Missouri, United States
- Died: October 16, 1913 (aged 60) Dayton, Washington, United States
- Party: Democratic

Alfred Harrison Weatherford, Jr. (October 10, 1853 – October 16, 1913) was an American politician in the state of Washington. He served in the Washington House of Representatives from 1889 to 1891.
