= Shoal Creek (Chariton River tributary) =

Stream in the U.S. states of Iowa and Missouri

Coordinates: 40°28′06″N 92°42′18″W

Shoal Creek is a stream in Appanoose and Wayne counties of Iowa and Putnam County, Missouri, United States. It is a tributary of the Chariton River.

Prior to channeling of the Chariton the confluence was approximately two miles south of the community of Livonia and on the Putnam-Schuyler county line. The channeling moved the Chariton approximately three-quarter mile to the east resulting in the current confluence being within western Schuyler County.

Shoal Creek was so named on account of its shallow depth.

== See also ==
- List of rivers of Iowa
- List of rivers of Missouri
