= James K. Weatherford =

American lawyer and politician (1850–1935)

James K. Weatherford was elected to the Oregon House of Representatives while still in his 20s.

James Knox Weatherford, Sr., (March 3, 1850 – July 30, 1935) was an attorney, judge, and politician in the American state of Oregon. Weatherford served one term in the Oregon House of Representatives, gaining the position of Speaker of the House in 1876, before serving three terms in the Oregon State Senate.

A successful attorney, Weatherford was for more than five decades a member of the school board in his hometown of Albany, Oregon, elected mayor of that city in 1886 and 1887, and served for more than two decades as chair of the Board of Trustees of Oregon State University, known at the time as Oregon Agricultural College.

Weatherford is the namesake of Weatherford Residential College, formerly Weatherford Hall, a prominent building on the campus of Oregon State University. The law firm which he established in Albany in 1875 remains in existence today. Weatherford is also remembered for his unsuccessful campaigns as a Democrat for United States Congress in 1894 and 1902.

== Biography ==
=== Early years ===
Weatherford was born March 3, 1850, at Unionville, Putnam County, Missouri. His father, Alfred H. Weatherford, was a native of the state of Virginia and his mother, the former Sophia Smith, was born in Ohio. His father moved to Illinois early in his life and it was in that state that the couple met and married, soon purchasing land in Putnam County, Missouri, towards the western edge of American development in that period.

In addition to farming, Weatherford's father was a small-time local politician, winning election as county clerk of Putnam County and serving in that capacity until his death in 1856. His mother died in 1862, leaving Weatherford an orphan at a young age. In 1864 Weatherford traveled to Oregon along with the family of a friend of his late father's. In his own later telling of the tale, Weatherford said that he had been passing time in a local mercantile when his father's friend William Morgan had casually remarked, "Jimmy, I’m leaving for Oregon tomorrow — you ought to come along and drive a team for me," with the young Weatherford rather spontaneously taking him up on the offer.

Weatherford worked for a time in Eastern Oregon as a driver of ox teams before moving to the small town of Brownsville in Western Oregon to take a position as an operative in a woolen mill. The mill was destroyed by fire in 1865, however, and Weatherford was briefly forced to return to his previous occupation driving ox teams in the arid eastern part of the state.

Another mill position was found in Western Oregon in the fall of 1865 and Weatherford continued there until the opening of Oregon State University in 1868, in which he immediately enrolled. Weatherford graduated from Oregon State University in civil engineering in 1872. Weatherford was a member of the school's third graduating class. While attending school Weatherford lived in a small hut which he constructed at the cost of $75 and worked as a farmhand during the summer harvest season to help defray the cost of his education. He nevertheless found himself $800 in financial arrears at the time of graduation and took a position as a school teacher to pay off this debt. He taught for two years before being elected Linn County Superintendent of Schools, a position which he retained for an additional two years.

While working as a teacher and school administrator, Weatherford studied law in his spare time, gaining admission to the Oregon State Bar in September 1876. He opened a law office in Albany, Oregon, which would continue in operation in partnership with others for more than 45 years. Weatherford specialized in criminal law and was regarded as an effective trial lawyer, defending numerous clients accused in murder cases over the course of his career.

Weatherford was financially prosperous and invested in downtown real estate in his hometown of Albany, holding as well financial interests in farms in Linn County, forest lands in Lincoln County, and woolen mills in the city of Salem. He was also tapped as president of a new railroad line in 1898, called the Corvallis and Eastern Railroad. His timber holdings were particularly vast, with one obituary at the time of his death indicating that Weatherford was "at one time perhaps the largest individual timber owner in Oregon."

=== Political career ===
James K. Weatherford as he appeared during the later years of his life.

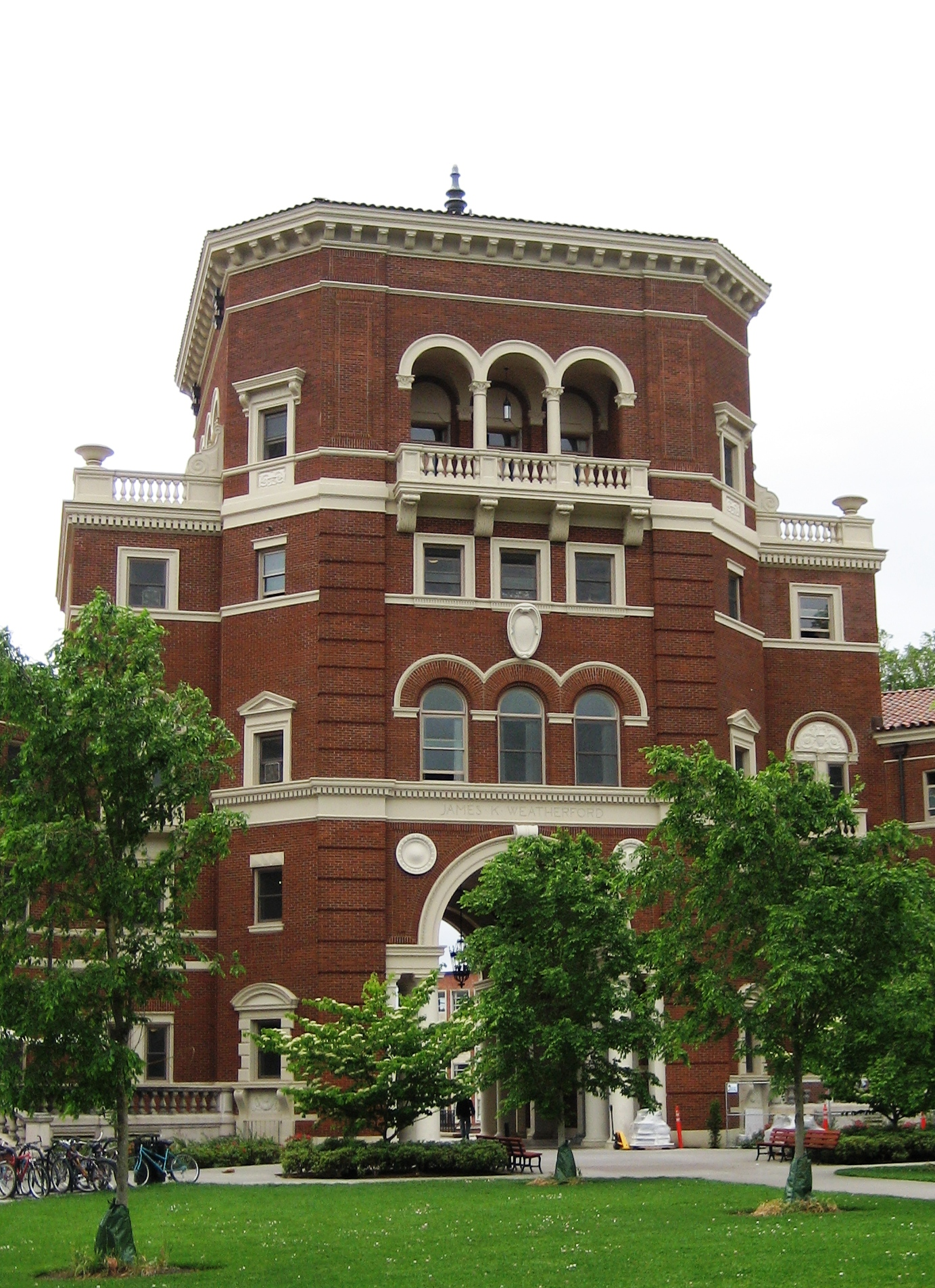
Weatherford Hall, built at Oregon State University in 1928, remains a campus landmark.

In 1876 Weatherford ran for the Oregon State Legislature for the first time, gaining election to the House of Representatives as a Democrat. He served a single two-year term in that body, gaining election by his peers as Speaker of the House.

Weatherford then moved to the Oregon State Senate, winning election for the first time in 1878 and ultimately serving a total of three four-year terms of office, albeit not in succession.

In 1882 Weatherford attempted to win a place in statewide office, standing the Democratic nominee for Oregon Secretary of State. He was defeated by Republican incumbent R.P. Earhart in the June general election, however.

Weatherford was elected mayor of Albany, Oregon, and served two terms, heading the city government in 1886 and 1887.

Weatherford returned to the Oregon State Senate in 1890, with Linn County voters sending the Democrat back to Salem. With his term coming to a close in 1894, rather than seek re-election Weatherford's name was put forward by the Democratic Party as its nominee for United States Congress. He was soundly defeated by Republican Binger Hermann in a crowded field that included candidates of the People's Party and Prohibition Party.

Weatherford was recognized for having played an instrumental role during his tenure as an Oregon legislator in the passage of a law compensating the counties of Western Oregon for millions of dollars in lost tax revenues related to land grants to the Oregon and California Railroad.

Weatherford was nominated by the Democratic Party of Oregon to be its candidate for Congress in the Oregon 1st Congressional District in the election of November 1902. He was unsuccessful in this campaign, falling to defeat at the hands of incumbent Thomas H. Tongue, who died before the start of the 58th Congress to which he had been elected.

=== Later years ===
Following the end of his partisan political career Weatherford continued to be an active member of the Albany School Board, serving continuously on that body for a total of 52 years. He also remained active in a number of fraternal and benevolent organizations, including the Masons, the Benevolent and Protective Order of Elks, and the Independent Order of Odd Fellows. He served as a Grand Master of the last mentioned organization.

Weatherford was a longtime member of the Oregon Agricultural College Board of Regents from 1886 through 1929, serving as the president of that body from 1901 to the end of his tenure. Construction began in March of that year and took a period of six months, with some $460,000 being expended upon the project.

=== Death and legacy ===
James K. Weatherford, Sr. died at his home in Albany, Oregon on July 30, 1935. He was 85 years old at the time of his death.

Weatherford was married in 1877 to the former Annette Cottle, a native of Linn County, and the couple had two sons, named Realto and Alfred. Rather unusually, the individual named James K. Weatherford, Jr., at one time Linn County District Attorney, was actually the grandson of James K. Weatherford, Sr.

Weatherford is the namesake of Weatherford Hall, a dormitory built at Oregon State Agricultural College in 1928 and still in use on the Oregon State University campus. Construction began in March of that year and took a period of six months, with some $460,000 being expended upon the project. The building remained in use as a residence hall until a deteriorating roof and dangerous wiring forced its closure in 1994. An extensive remodel followed together with a rechristening in 2004 as Weatherford Residential College.

The law practice which Weatherford established in Albany, Oregon in 1875 continues in operation today as Weatherford Thompson, Attorneys at Law.
