= Graysville =

Graysville is the name of several places:

In the United States

- Graysville, Alabama
- Graysville, Georgia
- Graysville, Indiana
- Graysville, Missouri
- Graysville, Ohio
- Graysville, Pennsylvania (Greene County)
- Graysville, Pennsylvania (Huntingdon County)
- Graysville, Tennessee

Elsewhere

- Graysville, Manitoba, Canada
