= Samuel W. Arnold =

American politician

Samuel W. (Wat) Arnold
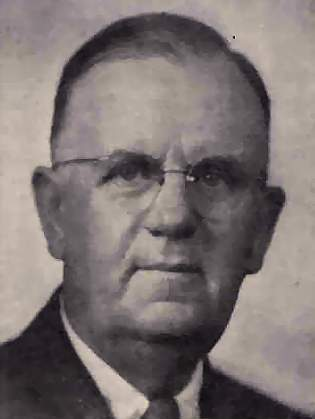

Member of the U.S. House of Representatives from Missouri's 1st district
- In office January 3, 1943 – January 3, 1949
- Preceded by: Milton A. Romjue
- Succeeded by: Clare Magee

Personal details
- Born: September 21, 1879 Downing, Missouri, US
- Died: December 18, 1961 (aged 82) Kirksville, Missouri, US
- Party: Republican
- Spouse: Myra Gertrude Mills
- Education: North Missouri Normal School (now known as Truman State University)
- Occupation: Lumber & building supply merchant

Samuel Washington (Wat) Arnold (September 21, 1879 – December 18, 1961) was a U.S. representative from Missouri.

== Early life and career ==
Born on September 21, 1879, on a farm near Downing in Schuyler County, Missouri, he was the son of Cumberland Wilson Arnold and Mary Elizabeth (Hill) Arnold. He attended the Coffey, Missouri, rural school, then advanced to the North Missouri Normal School (now known as Truman State University) in Kirksville, Missouri, graduating in 1902. After a brief career as a teacher and superintendent in several rural northeast Missouri schools, Mr. Arnold moved to St. Louis, Missouri, in 1904 for employment with the internal revenue office. It was also in 1904, on Christmas Eve, that Sam married his wife Myra Gertrude Mills. The following year, 1905, the Arnolds moved to Atlanta, Missouri, where he began a fifty-plus-year career as a lumberman. Seeking a larger customer base, Arnold moved his family to Kirksville in 1908 and established the Arnold Lumber Company. It continued to be a fixture of the Kirksville business community for the next seventy-five years.

== Politics ==
Arnold was elected as a Republican to the Seventy-eighth, Seventy-ninth, and Eightieth Congresses (January 3, 1943 – January 3, 1949). He was an unsuccessful candidate for reelection in 1948 to the Eighty-first Congress, for election in 1950 to the Eighty-second Congress, and in 1952 to the Eighty-third Congress. Following the defeats he retired from political life. Mr. Arnold was also a founding partner of North Missouri Broadcasting Company, which built and operated radio stations KIRX in Kirksville, Missouri, and KTTN in Trenton, Missouri. Congressman Arnold died in Kirksville, Missouri, December 18, 1961, and was interred in that city's Maple Hills Cemetery.

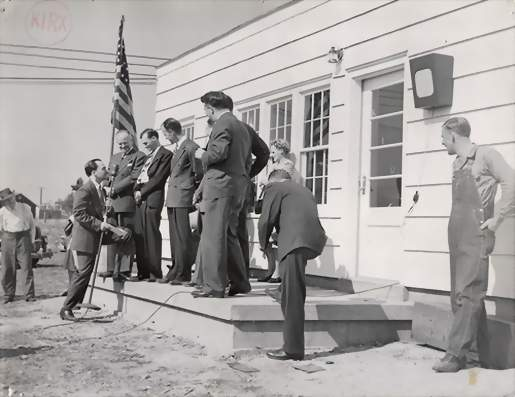
Congressman Arnold and other digintaries celebrate KIRX's first day of broadcasting, 10–17–1947.

U.S. House of Representatives
| Preceded by Milton A. Romjue | Member of the U.S. House of Representatives from Missouri's 1st congressional district 1943-1949 | Succeeded by Clare Magee |
