= Harrison Township, Mercer County, Missouri =

Township in Mercer County, Missouri, U.S.

Coordinates: 40°25′19″N 93°41′42″W

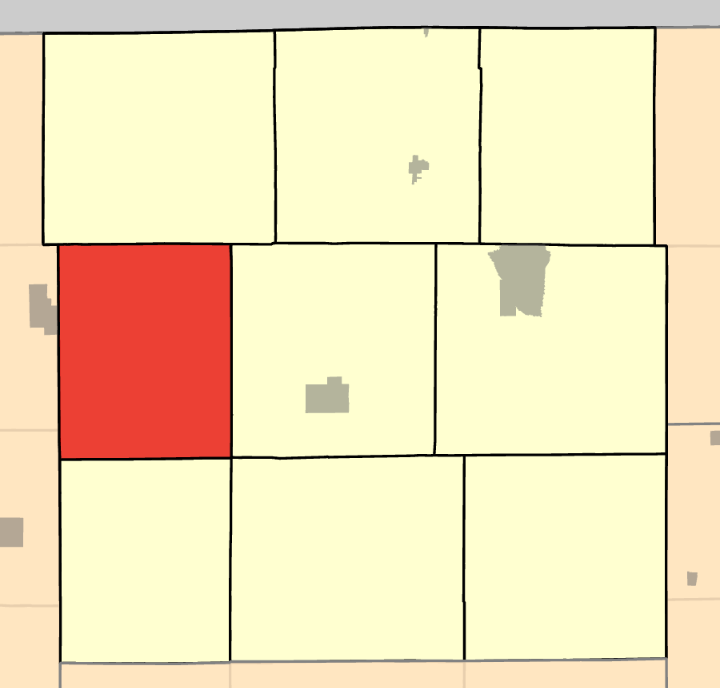

Harrison Township is a township in Mercer County, in the U.S. state of Missouri.

Harrison Township was established in 1843, and most likely named in honor of William Henry Harrison, 9th President of the United States.

== Transportation ==
The following highways travel through the township:

- U.S. Route 136
- Route 145
- Route A
- Route B
- Route CC
- Route N
- Route WW
