= Morgan Township, Mercer County, Missouri =

Township in Mercer County, Missouri, U.S.

Coordinates: 40.4361°N 93.5806°W

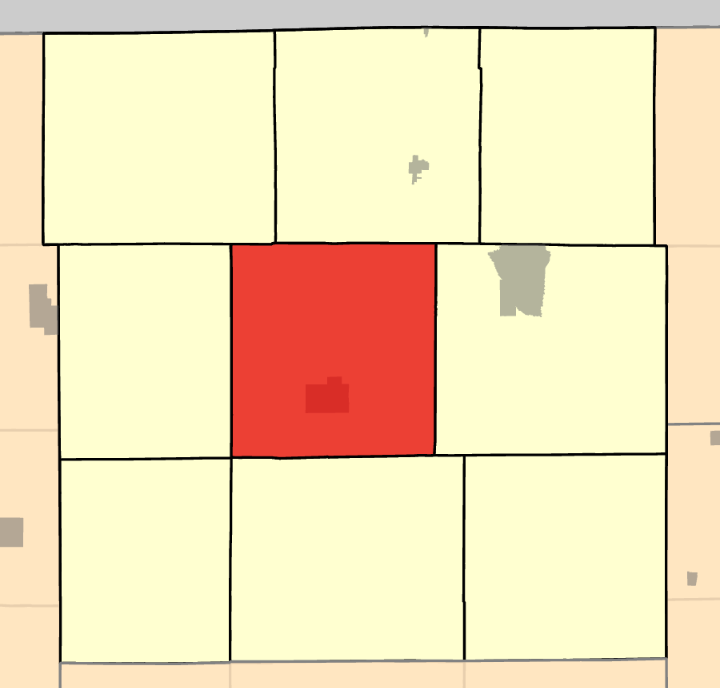

Morgan Township is a township in Mercer County, in the U.S. state of Missouri.

Morgan Township was established in 1843.

== Transportation ==
The following highways travel through the township:

- U.S. Route 65
- U.S. Route 136
- Route 145
- Route E
- Route FF
- Route P
- Route U
