= Worthington, Missouri =

- Village
- Location of Worthington, Missouri
- Coordinates: 40°24′31″N 92°41′21″W
- Country: United States
- State: Missouri
- County: Putnam

Area
  - Total: 0.13 sq mi (0.33 km^{2})
  - Land: 0.13 sq mi (0.33 km^{2})
  - Water: 0 sq mi (0.00 km^{2})
- Elevation: 807 ft (246 m)

Population (2020)
  - Total: 47
  - Density: 371.7/sq mi (143.53/km^{2})
- Time zone: UTC-6 (Central (CST))
  - Summer (DST): UTC-5 (CDT)
- ZIP code: 63567
- Area code: 660
- FIPS code: 29-81106
- GNIS feature ID: 2399744

Worthington is a village in southeast Putnam County, Missouri, United States. The population was 47 at the 2020 census.

== History ==
A post office called Worthington has been in operation since 1902. The community has the name of an early citizen.

== Geography ==
Worthington is located on Missouri Route W approximately one-half mile west of the Putnam-Schuyler county line which is on the Chariton River. Queen City (in Schuyler County) is approximately 6.5 miles to the east and the community of Martinstown on Missouri Route 149 is four miles west.

According to the United States Census Bureau, the village has a total area of 0.11 square miles (0.28 km^{2}), all land.

== Demographics ==
Historical population
Census	Pop.	Note	%±
1920	327		—
1930	239		−26.9%
1940	220		−7.9%
1950	186		−15.5%
1980	105		—
1990	86		−18.1%
2000	89		3.5%
2010	81		−9.0%
2020	47		−42.0%
U.S. Decennial Census

=== 2010 census ===
As of the census of 2010, there were 81 people, 33 households, and 19 families residing in the village. The population density was 736.4 inhabitants per square mile (284.3/km^{2}). There were 52 housing units at an average density of 472.7 per square mile (182.5/km^{2}). The racial makeup of the village was 100.0% White.

There were 33 households, of which 36.4% had children under the age of 18 living with them, 45.5% were married couples living together, 3.0% had a female householder with no husband present, 9.1% had a male householder with no wife present, and 42.4% were non-families. 39.4% of all households were made up of individuals, and 3% had someone living alone who was 65 years of age or older. The average household size was 2.45 and the average family size was 3.26.

The median age in the village was 32.5 years. 32.1% of residents were under the age of 18; 9.8% were between the ages of 18 and 24; 22.3% were from 25 to 44; 30.8% were from 45 to 64; and 4.9% were 65 years of age or older. The gender makeup of the village was 58.0% male and 42.0% female.

=== 2000 census ===
As of the census of 2000, there were 89 people, 42 households, and 27 families residing in the village. The population density was 726.8 inhabitants per square mile (280.6/km^{2}). There were 58 housing units at an average density of 473.6 per square mile (182.9/km^{2}). The racial makeup of the villagewas 100.00% White.

There were 42 households, out of which 31.0% had children under the age of 18 living with them, 45.2% were married couples living together, 11.9% had a female householder with no husband present, and 35.7% were non-families. 28.6% of all households were made up of individuals, and 7.1% had someone living alone who was 65 years of age or older. The average household size was 2.12 and the average family size was 2.56.

In the village, the population was spread out, with 20.2% under the age of 18, 9.0% from 18 to 24, 31.5% from 25 to 44, 29.2% from 45 to 64, and 10.1% who were 65 years of age or older. The median age was 38 years. For every 100 females, there were 134.2 males. For every 100 females age 18 and over, there were 136.7 males.

The median income for a household in the village was $11,964, and the median income for a family was $10,625. Males had a median income of $20,417 versus $18,750 for females. The per capita income for the village was $7,396. There were 52.0% of families and 42.1% of the population living below the poverty line, including 60.0% of under eighteens and 14.3% of those over 64.

== Education ==
The school district is Schuyler County R-I School District.
