= Madison Township, Mercer County, Missouri =

Township in Mercer County, Missouri, U.S.

Coordinates: 40.3133°N 93.7242°W

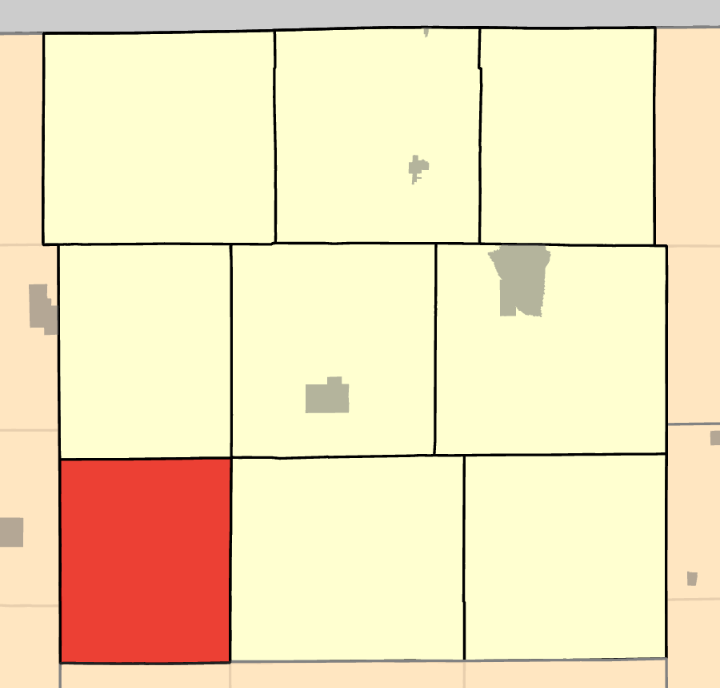

Madison Township is a township in Mercer County, in the U.S. state of Missouri.

Madison Township was established in 1843.

== Transportation ==
The following highways travel through the township:

- U.S. Route 136
- Route A
- Route CC
- Route D
- Route U
