= Colfax Township, Atchison County, Missouri =

Township in Atchison County, Missouri, U.S.

Colfax Township
- Township
- Coordinates: 40°25′43″N 95°14′37″W
- Country: United States
- State: Missouri
- County: Atchison

Area
  - Total: 41.98 sq mi (108.7 km^{2})
  - Land: 41.96 sq mi (108.7 km^{2})
  - Water: 0.02 sq mi (0.052 km^{2}) 0.05%
- Elevation: 1,037 ft (316 m)

Population (2020)
  - Total: 60
  - Density: 1.4/sq mi (0.54/km^{2})
- FIPS code: 29-00515454
- GNIS feature ID: 766234

Colfax Township is a township in Atchison County, Missouri, United States. At the 2020 census, its population was 60.

== History ==
Colfax Township split off from Tarkio Township in the late 19th-century. There were two settlements, Greenville and London.

== Geography ==
Colfax Township covers an area of 41.98 square miles (108.7 km^{2}) and contains no incorporated settlements. It contains two cemeteries: London and Prairie Hill.

Greenville was a settlement in what was southern Tarkio Township, but presently southwest Colfax Township.

== Transportation ==
The following highways travel through the township:

- U.S. Route 136
- Route M
- Route N
- Route YY
