= Omaha, Missouri =

Unincorporated community in Missouri, United States

Coordinates: 40°31′57″N 92°48′03″W

Omaha is an unincorporated community in Putnam County, in the U.S. state of Missouri.

== History ==
The first permanent settlement at Omaha was made in 1845. A post office called Omaha was established in 1860, and remained in operation until 1908. The name "Omaha" was assigned by postal officials.
