= Ravanna Township, Mercer County, Missouri =

Township in Mercer County, Missouri, U.S.

Coordinates: 40°25′49″N 93°26′21″W

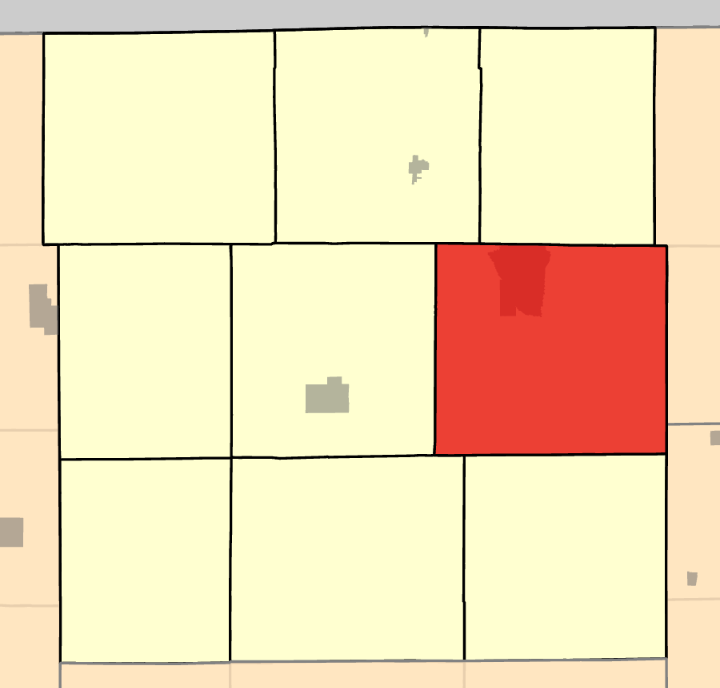

Ravanna Township is a township in Mercer County, in the U.S. state of Missouri.

Ravanna Township was established in 1859, taking its name from the community of Ravanna, Missouri.

== Transportation ==
The following highways travel through the township:

- U.S. Route 136
- Route AA
- Route C
- Route DD
- Route E
- Route O
- Route W
- Route Z
