= Rosewood, Missouri =

Unincorporated community in Missouri, United States

Coordinates: 40°25′30″N 92°55′23″W

Rosewood is an unincorporated community in Putnam County, in the U.S. state of Missouri.

== History ==
Rosewood had its start as a post office serving a rural area. A post office called Rosewood was established in 1897, and remained in operation until 1908.
