= Quinn, Missouri =

Unincorporated community in Missouri, United States

Coordinates: 40°24′26″N 93°10′08″W

Quinn is an unincorporated community in Putnam County, in the U.S. state of Missouri.

== History ==
A post office called Quinn was established in 1890, and remained in operation until 1905. The post office was maintained inside the house of a private citizen.
