= Wyreka, Missouri =

Unincorporated community in Missouri, United States

Coordinates: 40°31′46″N 93°15′54″W

Wyreka is an unincorporated community in Putnam County, in the U.S. state of Missouri.

Wyreka was platted in 1858. The name most likely is a phonetic transfer from Yreka, California.
