= Clare Magee =

American politician

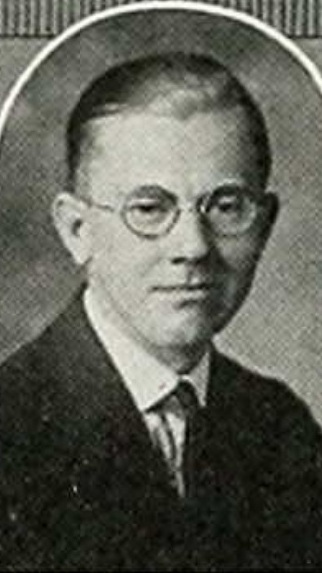

Member of the U.S. House of Representatives from Missouri's 1st district
- In office January 3, 1949 – January 3, 1953
- Preceded by: Samuel W. Arnold
- Succeeded by: Frank M. Karsten

Personal details
- Born: March 31, 1899 Livonia, Missouri, U.S.
- Died: August 7, 1969 (aged 70) Unionville, Missouri, U.S.
- Party: Democratic
- Education: University of Missouri

Military service
- Branch/service: United States Navy; United States Army
- Battles/wars: World War I World War II

Clare Magee (March 31, 1899 – August 7, 1969) was an American lawyer and politician from Missouri who served as a member of the United States House of Representatives from 1949 to 1953.

== Early life and education ==
Born on a farm in Putnam County near Livonia, Missouri, Magee graduated from Unionville (Missouri) High School, and attended Kirksville State Teachers College and the University of Missouri. He studied law at the University of Missouri School of Law.

== Career ==
During World War I, Magee served in the United States Navy as a seaman first class and small arms instructor. After the war, he homesteaded in the Bighorn Basin region and worked as a laborer for the United States Reclamation Service in Deaver, Wyoming.

He was admitted to the bar in 1922, and commenced practice in Unionville, Missouri. Magee owned and operated his family's farm beginning in 1932, and was postmaster of Unionville from 1935 to 1941.

Magee joined the Army during World War II and served as a private in the Field Artillery Branch. He was subsequently commissioned as a captain in the United States Army Air Corps, and served until the end of the war.

In 1948 Magee was elected as a Democrat to the Eighty-first Congress. He was reelected in 1950 to the Eighty-second Congress, and he served from January 3, 1949, to January 3, 1953. Magee was not a candidate for renomination in 1952. During his congressional career, he earned recognition for his efforts to extend G.I. Bill benefits to veterans of the Korean War. After leaving Congress, Magee resumed the practice of law.

== Personal life ==
In 1941, Magee was charged with in the fatal shooting of his cousin, Charles Magee. He was acquitted on a plea of temporary insanity. Evidence at his trial indicated that Clare shot Charles Magee when Charles was in police custody, and that Charles was distraught because Charles had stabbed Clare's brother, Dr. E. H. Magee.

Magee died in Unionville on August 7, 1969, and was buried at Unionville Cemetery.
