= Martinstown, Missouri =

Unincorporated community in Missouri, United States

Coordinates: 40°24′38″N 92°46′14″W

Martinstown is an unincorporated community in southeast Putnam County, in the U.S. state of Missouri.

The community is at the intersection of Missouri Route 149 and Missouri Route W. Worthington is approximately four miles east near the Putnam-Schuyler county line. Unionville is about 14 miles to the northeast.

== History ==
Martinstown was platted in 1857, and named after Neal Martin, a local judge. A post office called Martinstown was established in 1857, and remained in operation until 1900.
