= Downing station =

Downing
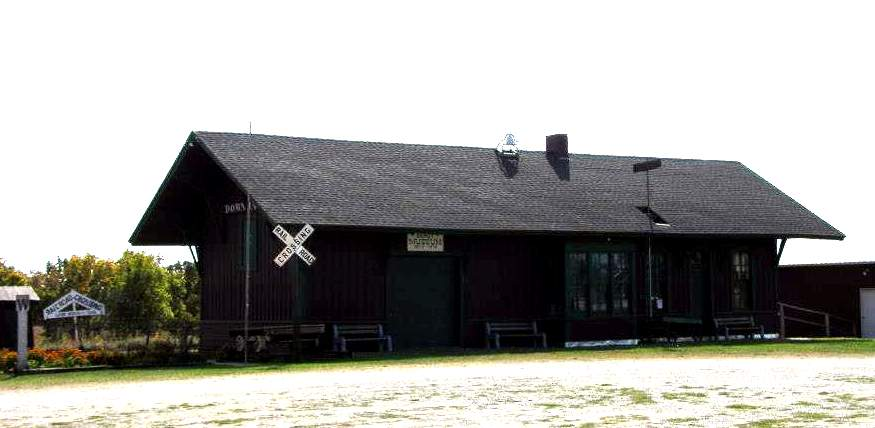
- Downing Railroad Depot, September 2012

General information
- Location: South Bondurant Street, Downing, Missouri 63536
- System: Former Burlington Route passenger station

History
- Opened: 1872

Services
Preceding station	Burlington Route	Following station
Lancaster toward Shenandoah	Shenandoah – Keokuk	Crawford toward Keokuk
- Downing Railroad Depot
- U.S. National Register of Historic Places
- Location within Missouri Location within the United States
- Location: City Park, Downing, Missouri
- Coordinates: 40°28′59″N 92°22′8″W
- Area: less than one acre
- Built: 1872
- Built by: Keokuk & Western Railroad County
- NRHP reference No.: 83001037
- Added to NRHP: March 29, 1983
Location

Downing station, also known as the Depot Museum, is a historic train station located at Downing, Schuyler County, Missouri. It was built in 1872 by the Keokuk & Western Railroad. It is a one-story, frame building with board and batten siding. The building features a gable roof with wide overhanging eaves and ornate cross stickwork brackets. It was moved to its present location in 1976, and houses a local history museum.

It was added to the National Register of Historic Places in 1983 as the Downing Railroad Depot.
