= Chapel, Putnam County, Missouri =

Unincorporated community in Missouri, United States

Coordinates: 40°32′26″N 92°43′47″W

Chapel is an unincorporated community in Putnam County, in the U.S. state of Missouri.

== History ==
Chapel was originally named Quakersville; the present name is after the local Quaker chapel. A post office called Chapel was established in 1897, and remained in operation until 1906.
