= Athens Township, Gentry County, Missouri =

Township in Gentry County, Missouri, U.S.

Athens Township
- Township
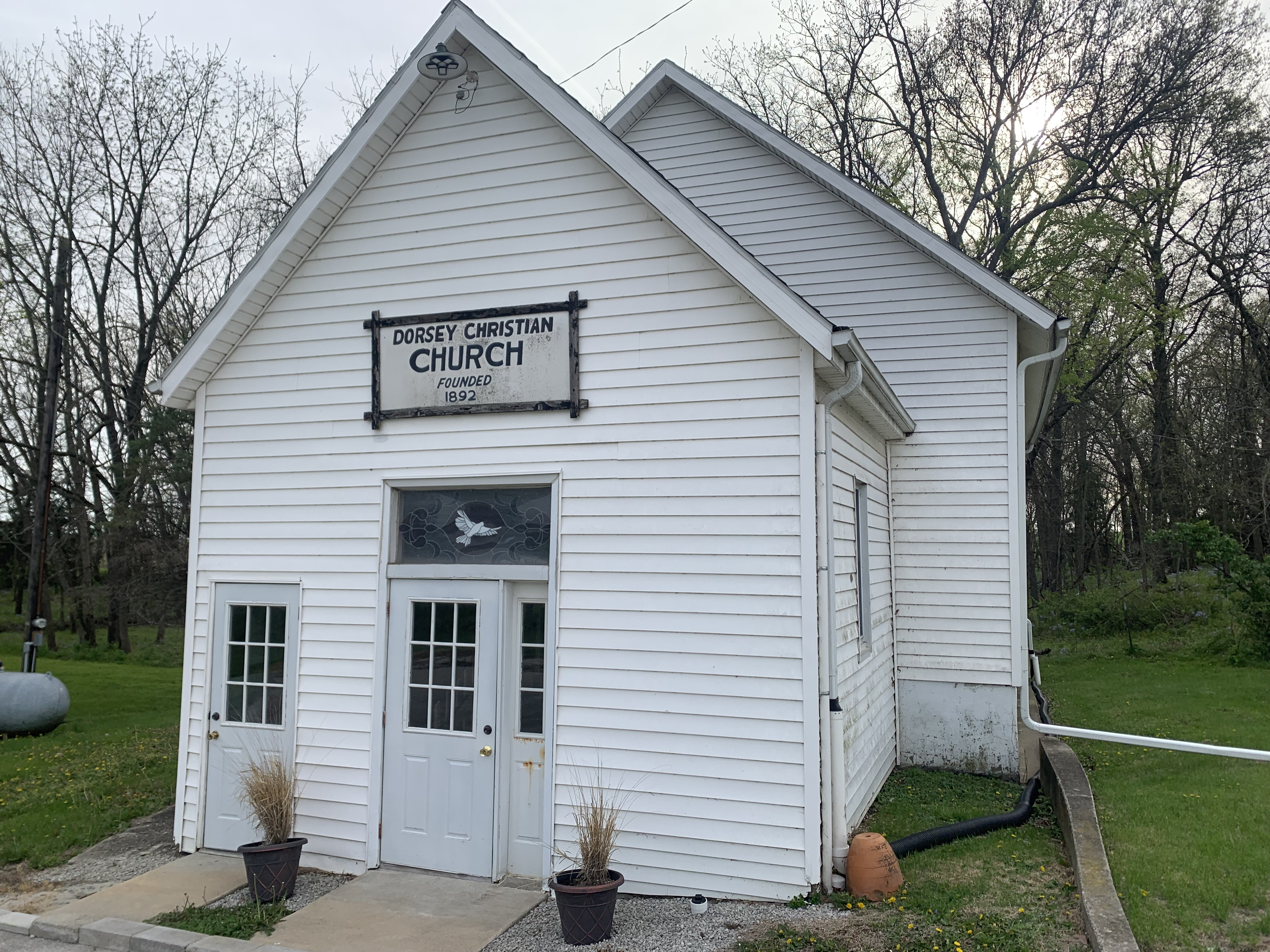
- Dorsey Christian Church in Athens Township

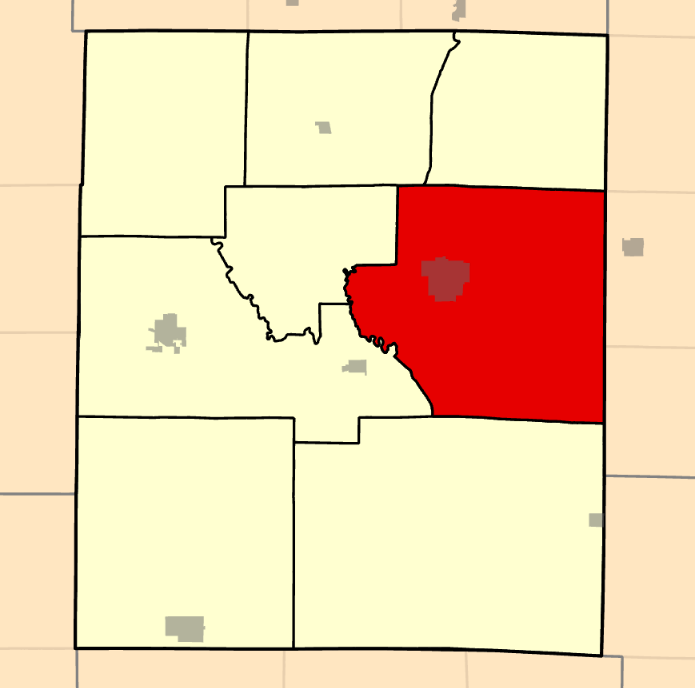
- Coordinates: 40°13′43″N 94°17′25″W
- Country: United States
- State: Missouri
- County: Gentry

Area
  - Total: 76.1 sq mi (197 km^{2})
  - Land: 76.02 sq mi (196.9 km^{2})
  - Water: 0.08 sq mi (0.21 km^{2}) 0.11%
- Elevation: 1,001 ft (305 m)

Population (2020)
  - Total: 2,084
  - Density: 27.4/sq mi (10.6/km^{2})
- FIPS code: 29-07502386
- GNIS feature ID: 766664

Athens Township is a township in Gentry County, Missouri, United States. At the 2020 census, its population was 2084.

Athens Township was named after the original name of what now is Albany, Missouri.

A settlement in southwest Athens Township called Albany Junction was located at the junction between two railroads.

== Transportation ==
The following highways travel through the township:

- U.S. Route 136
- Route 85
- Route A
- Route C
- Route EE
- Route J
- Route N
- Route P
