= Esper, Missouri =

Unincorporated community in Missouri, United States

Coordinates: 40°31′44″N 92°51′08″W

Esper is an unincorporated community in Putnam County, in the U.S. state of Missouri.

The community most likely has the name of the local Esper family.
