= Graysville, Missouri =

Unincorporated community in Missouri, United States

Coordinates: 40°26′45″N 92°46′45″W

Graysville is an unincorporated community in eastern Putnam County, in the U.S. state of Missouri.

The community is on Missouri Route 149. Unionville is approximately eleven miles to the west.

== History ==
A post office called Graysville was established in 1875, and remained in operation until 1906. The community has the name of one Mr. Gray, who was credited with securing a post office for the town.
