= Elko, Missouri =

Unincorporated community in Missouri, United States

Coordinates: 40°24′54″N 92°51′54″W

Elko is an unincorporated community in Putnam County, in the U.S. state of Missouri.

== History ==
Elko was originally called Garfield Springs, and under the latter name was platted in 1833. A post office called Elko was established in 1885, and remained in operation until 1908.
