= Lucerne, Missouri =

- Village
- Location of Lucerne, Missouri
- Coordinates: 40°27′50″N 93°17′28″W
- Country: United States
- State: Missouri
- County: Putnam

Area
  - Total: 0.25 sq mi (0.65 km^{2})
  - Land: 0.25 sq mi (0.65 km^{2})
  - Water: 0 sq mi (0.00 km^{2})
- Elevation: 981 ft (299 m)

Population (2020)
  - Total: 57
  - Density: 228.0/sq mi (88.04/km^{2})
- Time zone: UTC-6 (Central (CST))
  - Summer (DST): UTC-5 (CDT)
- ZIP code: 64655
- Area code: 660
- FIPS code: 29-44372
- GNIS feature ID: 2399198

Lucerne is a village in western Putnam County, Missouri, United States. The population was 57 at the 2020 census.

== History ==
Lucerne was platted in 1887. The community most likely took its name from Lucerne, Ohio. A post office called Lucerne has been in operation since 1887.

== Geography ==
Lucerne is located on US Route 136 approximately 15 miles west of Unionville. Powersville is six miles north and Newtown in northwest Sullivan County is six miles south. Medicine Creek flows past one-half mile to the east. The Chicago, Milwaukee, St. Paul and Pacific Railroad passes the east side of the location.

According to the United States Census Bureau, the village has a total area of 0.25 square miles (0.65 km^{2}), all land.

== Demographics ==
Historical population
Census	Pop.	Note	%±
1900	292		—
1910	264		−9.6%
1920	316		19.7%
1930	282		−10.8%
1940	258		−8.5%
1950	227		−12.0%
1960	157		−30.8%
1970	126		−19.7%
1980	130		3.2%
1990	51		−60.8%
2000	92		80.4%
2010	85		−7.6%
2020	57		−32.9%
U.S. Decennial Census

=== 2010 census ===
As of the census of 2010, there were 85 people, 36 households, and 25 families living in the village. The population density was 340.0 inhabitants per square mile (131.3/km^{2}). There were 51 housing units at an average density of 204.0 per square mile (78.8/km^{2}). The racial makeup of the village was 98.8% White and 1.2% Asian.

There were 36 households, of which 27.8% had children under the age of 18 living with them, 63.9% were married couples living together, 2.8% had a female householder with no husband present, 2.8% had a male householder with no wife present, and 30.6% were non-families. 27.8% of all households were made up of individuals, and 16.7% had someone living alone who was 65 years of age or older. The average household size was 2.36 and the average family size was 2.84.

The median age in the village was 30.8 years. 18.8% of residents were under the age of 18; 11.7% were between the ages of 18 and 24; 23.5% were from 25 to 44; 16.5% were from 45 to 64; and 29.4% were 65 years of age or older. The gender makeup of the village was 51.8% male and 48.2% female.

=== 2000 census ===
As of the census of 2000, there were 92 people, 42 households, and 23 families living in the village. The population density was 369.5 inhabitants per square mile (142.7/km^{2}). There were 53 housing units at an average density of 212.8 per square mile (82.2/km^{2}). The racial makeup of the village was 95.65% White, 2.17% African American, and 2.17% from two or more races.

There were 42 households, out of which 16.7% had children under the age of 18 living with them, 54.8% were married couples living together, 2.4% had a female householder with no husband present, and 42.9% were non-families. 35.7% of all households were made up of individuals, and 19.0% had someone living alone who was 65 years of age or older. The average household size was 2.19 and the average family size was 2.71.

In the village, the population was spread out, with 15.2% under the age of 18, 6.5% from 18 to 24, 27.2% from 25 to 44, 25.0% from 45 to 64, and 26.1% who were 65 years of age or older. The median age was 46 years. For every 100 females, there were 109.1 males. For every 100 females age 18 and over, there were 100.0 males.

The median income for a household in the village was $16,500, and the median income for a family was $31,250. Males had a median income of $24,583 versus $14,375 for females. The per capita income for the village was $11,046. There were 28.0% of families and 41.2% of the population living below the poverty line, including no under eighteens and 27.6% of those over 64.

== Education ==
It is in the Putnam County R-I School District.
