= Galesburg, Putnam County, Missouri =

Unincorporated community in Missouri, United States

Coordinates: 40°31′08″N 93°18′46″W

Galesburg is an unincorporated community in Putnam County, in the U.S. state of Missouri.

Galesburg was platted in 1858.
