= Sidney, Missouri =

Unincorporated community in Missouri, United States

Coordinates: 40°21′15″N 92°49′09″W

Sidney is an unincorporated community in Putnam County, in the U.S. state of Missouri.

== History ==
A post office called Sidney was established in 1889, and remained in operation until 1908. The community most likely has the name of a local citizen.
