= Sherman Township, Putnam County, Missouri =

Township in Putnam County, Missouri, U.S.

Coordinates: 40.52°N 93.13°W

Sherman Township is a township in northern Putnam County, Missouri.

The organization date and origin of the name of Sherman Township is unknown.
