= Modena, Missouri =

Unincorporated community in Missouri, U.S.

Coordinates: 40°18′01″N 93°40′50″W

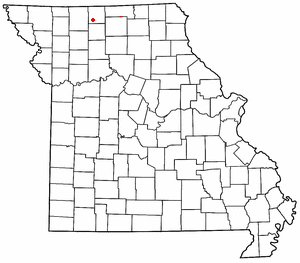

Modena is an unincorporated community in southwestern Mercer County, Missouri, United States. It is located approximately eight miles southeast of Princeton on Missouri Supplemental Route A.

Modena was originally called Madisonville, and it was platted under the latter name in 1856. A post office called Modena was established in 1858, and remained in operation until 1971. The present name most likely is a transfer from Mòdena, Italy.

== Demographics ==
Historical population
Census	Pop.	Note	%±
1910	111		—
1920	115		3.6%
1930	79		−31.3%
1940	95		20.3%
1950	95		0.0%
1960	66		−30.5%
1970	61		−7.6%
Missouri Census Data Center
