= Elm Township, Putnam County, Missouri =

Township in Putnam County, Missouri, U.S.

Coordinates: 40.37°N 92.75°W

Elm Township is a township in southeastern Putnam County, Missouri.

The organization date and origin of the name of Elm Township is unknown.
