= Union Township, Putnam County, Missouri =

Township in Putnam County, Missouri, U.S.

Coordinates: 40.52°N 93.01°W

Union Township is a township in northern Putnam County, Missouri. The county seat of Unionville is primarily located in the southeastern portion of this township.

The organization date and origin of the name of Union Township is unknown. All of Lake Thunderhead is in the center of this township.
