= Powersville, Missouri =

- Village
- Location of Powersville, Missouri
- Coordinates: 40°32′58″N 93°18′01″W
- Country: United States
- State: Missouri
- County: Putnam

Area
  - Total: 0.57 sq mi (1.47 km^{2})
  - Land: 0.56 sq mi (1.46 km^{2})
  - Water: 0 sq mi (0.00 km^{2})
- Elevation: 1,014 ft (309 m)

Population (2020)
  - Total: 42
  - Density: 74.5/sq mi (28.75/km^{2})
- Time zone: UTC-6 (Central (CST))
  - Summer (DST): UTC-5 (CDT)
- ZIP code: 64672
- Area code: 660
- FIPS code: 29-59420
- GNIS feature ID: 2399015

Powersville is a village in northwest Putnam County, Missouri, United States. The population was 42 at the 2020 census.

== History ==
Powersville was platted in 1887 when the railroad was extended to that point. The community was named after Israel Powers, the original owner of the town site. A post office has been in operation at Powersville since 1887.

== Geography ==
Powersville is located in northwest Putnam County on Missouri Route E three miles west of Missouri Route 139. Lucerne is six miles to the south and the Missouri-Iowa border is two miles north. Medicine Creek flows past one mile to the west and the Chicago, Milwaukee, St. Paul and Pacific Railroad passes the west side of the location.

According to the United States Census Bureau, the village has a total area of 0.56 square miles (1.45 km^{2}), all land.

== Demographics ==
Historical population
Census	Pop.	Note	%±
1920	356		—
1930	285		−19.9%
1940	294		3.2%
1950	227		−22.8%
1960	189		−16.7%
1970	125		−33.9%
1980	116		−7.2%
1990	38		−67.2%
2000	86		126.3%
2010	60		−30.2%
2020	42		−30.0%
U.S. Decennial Census

=== 2010 census ===
As of the census of 2010, there were 60 people, 33 households, and 19 families living in the village. The population density was 107.1 inhabitants per square mile (41.4/km^{2}). There were 53 housing units at an average density of 94.6 per square mile (36.5/km^{2}). The racial makeup of the village was 98.3% White and 1.7% from two or more races.

There were 33 households, of which 18.2% had children under the age of 18 living with them, 45.5% were married couples living together, 6.1% had a female householder with no husband present, 6.1% had a male householder with no wife present, and 42.4% were non-families. 42.4% of all households were made up of individuals, and 33.3% had someone living alone who was 65 years of age or older. The average household size was 1.82 and the average family size was 2.37.

The median age in the village was 61.5 years. 13.3% of residents were under the age of 18; 1.6% were between the ages of 18 and 24; 6.7% were from 25 to 44; 36.6% were from 45 to 64; and 41.7% were 65 years of age or older. The gender makeup of the village was 50.0% male and 50.0% female.

=== 2000 census ===
As of the census of 2000, there were 86 people, 41 households, and 27 families living in the city. The population density was 153.3 inhabitants per square mile (59.2/km^{2}). There were 52 housing units at an average density of 92.7 per square mile (35.8/km^{2}). The racial makeup of the city was 100.00% White.

There were 41 households, out of which 26.8% had children under the age of 18 living with them, 53.7% were married couples living together, 4.9% had a female householder with no husband present, and 34.1% were non-families. 34.1% of all households were made up of individuals, and 22.0% had someone living alone who was 65 years of age or older. The average household size was 2.10 and the average family size was 2.56.

In the city the population was spread out, with 23.3% under the age of 18, 2.3% from 18 to 24, 29.1% from 25 to 44, 25.6% from 45 to 64, and 19.8% who were 65 years of age or older. The median age was 39 years. For every 100 females there were 79.2 males. For every 100 females age 18 and over, there were 94.1 males.

The median income for a household in the city was $25,750, and the median income for a family was $28,958. Males had a median income of $29,375 versus $7,500 for females. The per capita income for the village was $13,795. There were no families and 6.8% of the population living below the poverty line, including no under eighteens and 22.2% of those over 64.

== Education ==
It is in the Putnam County R-I School District.
