= Wilson Township, Putnam County, Missouri =

Township in Putnam County, Missouri, U.S.

Coordinates: 40.4287°N 93.005°W

Wilson Township is a township in southern Putnam County, Missouri. The county seat of Unionville is partly located in the northeastern portion of this township.

The organization date and origin of the name of Wilson Township is unknown.
