= Hartford, Missouri =

Unincorporated community in Missouri, United States

Coordinates: 40°28′11″N 92°50′09″W

Hartford is an unincorporated community in Putnam County, in the U.S. state of Missouri.

== History ==
A post office called Hartford was established in 1851, and remained in operation until 1900. The community was named after Hertford, in England, perhaps via another American town with the name Hartford.
