= Richland Township, Putnam County, Missouri =

Township in Putnam County, Missouri, U.S.

Coordinates: 40.4290°N 92.88°W

Richland Township is a township in southern Putnam County, Missouri.

The organization date and origin of the name of Richland Township is unknown.
