= Wyaconda Township, Clark County, Missouri =

Township in the American state of Missouri

Coordinates: 40.4308°N 91.8700°W

Wyaconda Township is an inactive township in Clark County, in the U.S. state of Missouri.

Wyaconda Township took its name from the Wyaconda River.
