= Grant Township, Custer County, Nebraska =

Grant Township
- Township
- Location in Custer County
- Coordinates: 41°07′00″N 099°58′04″W
- Country: United States
- State: Nebraska
- County: Custer

Area
  - Total: 79.80 sq mi (206.69 km^{2})
  - Land: 79.80 sq mi (206.69 km^{2})
  - Water: 0 sq mi (0 km^{2}) 0%
- Elevation: 2,812 ft (857 m)

Population (2020)
  - Total: 51
  - Density: 0.64/sq mi (0.25/km^{2})
- GNIS feature ID: 0838036

Grant Township is one of thirty-one townships in Custer County, Nebraska, United States. The population was 51 at the 2020 census. A 2021 estimate placed the township's population at 50.

Grant Township was organized in 1887.

== See also ==
- County government in Nebraska
