= Grant Township, Kearney County, Nebraska =

Grant Township
- Township
- Location in Kearney County
- Coordinates: 40°23′13″N 098°47′26″W
- Country: United States
- State: Nebraska
- County: Kearney

Area
  - Total: 35.99 sq mi (93.22 km^{2})
  - Land: 35.99 sq mi (93.22 km^{2})
  - Water: 0 sq mi (0 km^{2}) 0%
- Elevation: 2,103 ft (641 m)

Population (2020)
  - Total: 45
  - Density: 1.3/sq mi (0.48/km^{2})
- GNIS feature ID: 0838039

Grant Township is one of fourteen townships in Kearney County, Nebraska, United States. The population was 45 at the 2020 census. A 2021 estimate placed the township's population at 45.

== See also ==
- County government in Nebraska
