= Grant Township, Dallas County, Missouri =

Ijactive township in the US state of Missouri

Coordinates: 37.7636°N 93.1142°W

Grant Township is an inactive township in Dallas County, in the U.S. state of Missouri.

Grant Township was established in 1868, taking the name of Ulysses S. Grant, a general in the Civil War, and afterward President of the United States.
