= Downing, Missouri =

City in Schuyler County, Missouri, United States

- City
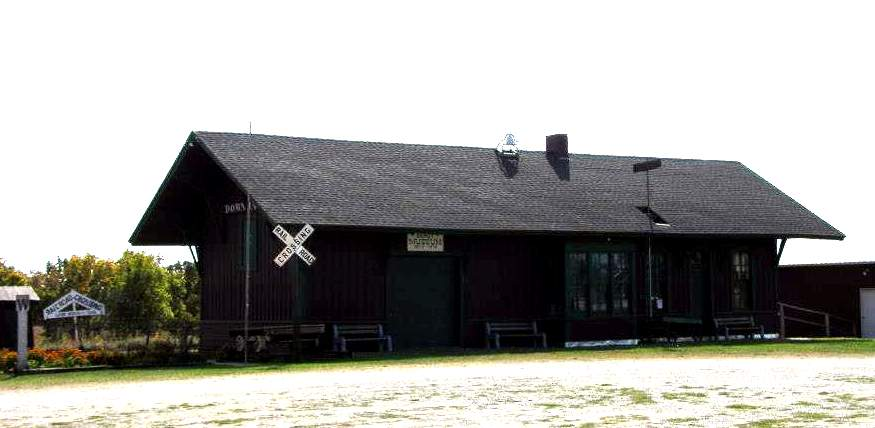
- Historic Downing railroad depot

- Location of Downing, Missouri
- Coordinates: 40°29′14″N 92°22′08″W
- Country: United States
- State: Missouri
- County: Schuyler

Area
  - Total: 0.66 sq mi (1.72 km^{2})
  - Land: 0.66 sq mi (1.71 km^{2})
  - Water: 0.0039 sq mi (0.01 km^{2})
- Elevation: 873 ft (266 m)

Population (2020)
  - Total: 300
  - Density: 455.1/sq mi (175.73/km^{2})
- Time zone: UTC-6 (Central (CST))
  - Summer (DST): UTC-5 (CDT)
- ZIP code: 63536
- Area code: 660
- FIPS code: 29-19990
- GNIS feature ID: 2394558

Downing is a city in Schuyler County, Missouri, United States. As of the 2020 census, its population was 300. It is part of the Kirksville Micropolitan Statistical Area.

== History ==
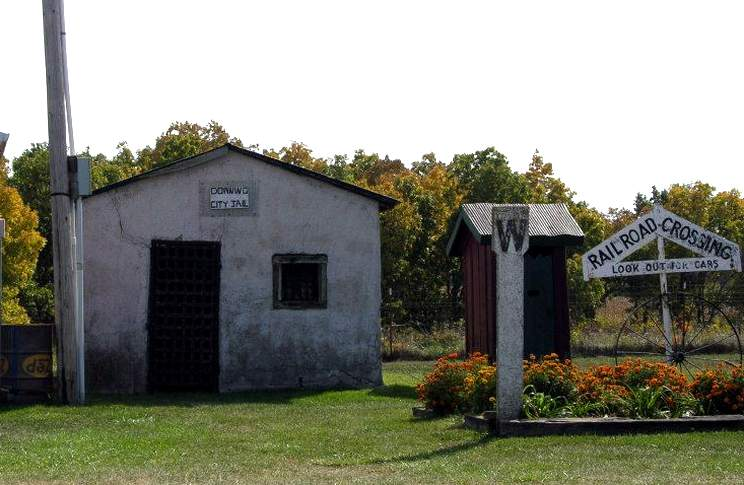
Downing Jail. No longer in use.

Although not being laid out as a town until 1872, the Downing area was one of the earliest settled areas of Schuyler County, with Henry Downing building a home and claiming land a few miles south of the area circa 1837. It was also near present-day Downing that the first school in the county was established. In the spring of 1841, a crude log cabin was built for this purpose near Henry Downing's home and Miss Esther Hathaway was employed as a teacher. One of the early names for the unincorporated settlement was Cherry Grove.

During the Civil War, on July 1, 1862, a small skirmish took place near Cherry Grove. Cavalry from the second battalion, Eleventh Missouri State Militia, a pro-Union force, engaged a small number of Confederate troops under Colonel Joseph C. Porter. Porter's outnumbered forces were defeated, with four killed and several men and horses captured. The Union forces had one man badly injured, who would die a few days later. At the time of the skirmish, Porter was heavily involved in recruiting men in northeast Missouri for the Confederate cause. The following month, he suffered a larger defeat some twenty-five miles southwest at the Battle of Kirksville.

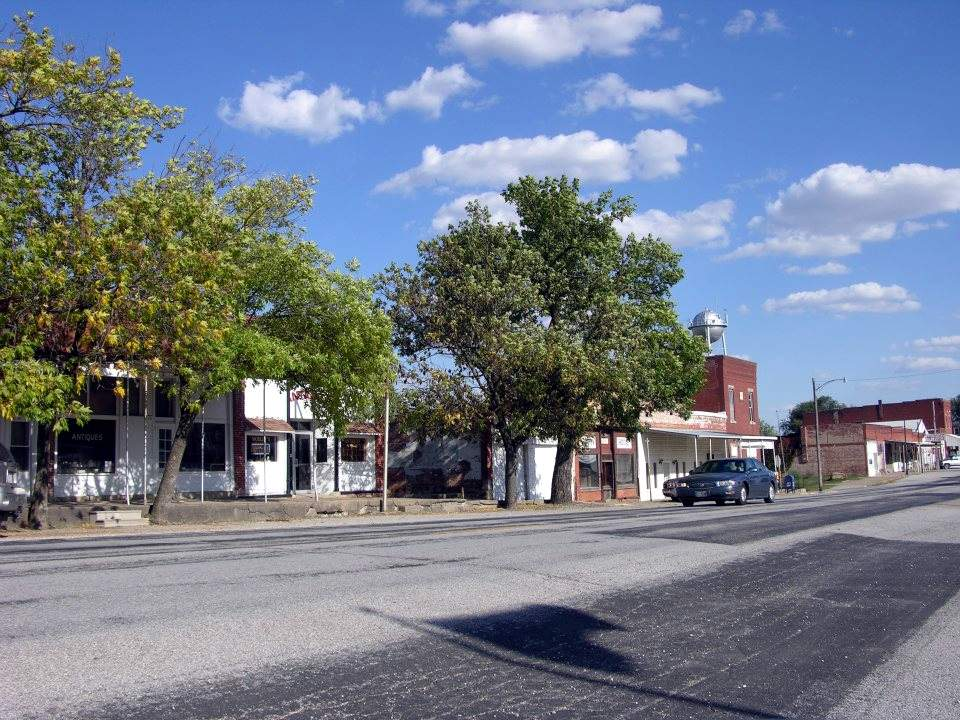
A portion of the Downing, Missouri business district. Many buildings date before 1900.

In September 1872, the Missouri Town Company created the original town plat, naming it for the president of the company, H. H. Downing. Land for the town, the railroad right of way, and depot were donated by James Prime, and the Missouri, Iowa, and Nebraska Railway constructed the depot in April 1872. By the late 1880s, the Downing business district included four general stores, two drug stores, two grocers, two hardware stores, a restaurant, blacksmith, and two hotels. Manufacturing included two handle factories, a wagon maker, a hoop factory, a harness and saddle maker, and two combination saw/grist mills. Downing had two tobacco-buying warehouses in the late 1800s, with both reporting extensive business. At its peak in 1902, over 155,000 pounds of tobacco were dealt through the Downing warehouses. The town's location on the Keokuk & Western railroad provided opportunity for the convenient shipment of goods, crops, and livestock from the Downing area.

The Downing Railroad Depot was listed on the National Register of Historic Places in 1983 and now serves as a museum. The depot was moved approximately one-quarter mile from its original trackside location and now serves as the centerpiece of a city park with other nearby buildings, including the former Downing jail.

== Geography ==
Downing is located at 40°29′16″N 92°22′5″W (40.487682, -92.368022).

According to the United States Census Bureau, the city has a total area of 0.67 square miles (1.74 km^{2}), of which 0.66 square miles (1.71 km^{2}) is land and 0.01 square miles (0.03 km^{2}) is water.

== Demographics ==
Historical population
Census	Pop.	Note	%±
1880	152		—
1890	406		167.1%
1900	501		23.4%
1910	513		2.4%
1920	566		10.3%
1930	514		−9.2%
1940	507		−1.4%
1950	453		−10.7%
1960	463		2.2%
1970	406		−12.3%
1980	462		13.8%
1990	359		−22.3%
2000	396		10.3%
2010	335		−15.4%
2020	300		−10.4%
U.S. Decennial Census

=== 2010 census ===
As of the census of 2010, there were 335 people, 160 households, and 90 families residing in the city. The population density was 507.6 inhabitants per square mile (196.0/km^{2}). There were 195 housing units at an average density of 295.5 per square mile (114.1/km^{2}). The racial makeup of the city was 97.6% White, 0.3% Asian, and 2.1% from two or more races. Hispanic or Latino of any race were 0.6% of the population.

There were 160 households, of which 25.0% had children under the age of 18 living with them, 43.1% were married couples living together, 8.8% had a female householder with no husband present, 4.4% had a male householder with no wife present, and 43.8% were non-families. 40.0% of all households were made up of individuals, and 20.6% had someone living alone who was 65 years of age or older. The average household size was 2.09 and the average family size was 2.79.

The median age in the city was 44.8 years. 20% of residents were under the age of 18; 10% were between the ages of 18 and 24; 20.7% were from 25 to 44; 27.3% were from 45 to 64; and 22.4% were 65 years of age or older. The gender makeup of the city was 47.8% male and 52.2% female.

=== 2000 census ===
As of the census of 2000, there were 396 people, 176 households, and 99 families residing in the city. The population density was 595.4 inhabitants per square mile (229.9/km^{2}). There were 210 housing units at an average density of 315.7 per square mile (121.9/km^{2}). The racial makeup of the city was 95.96% White, 0.25% Native American, 1.26% from other races, and 2.53% from two or more races. Hispanic or Latino of any race were 2.27% of the population.

There were 176 households, out of which 26.7% had children under the age of 18 living with them, 48.3% were married couples living together, 6.3% had a female householder with no husband present, and 43.2% were non-families. 39.2% of all households were made up of individuals, and 21.0% had someone living alone who was 65 years of age or older. The average household size was 2.25 and the average family size was 3.03.

In the city the population was spread out, with 25.8% under the age of 18, 7.8% from 18 to 24, 24.2% from 25 to 44, 21.5% from 45 to 64, and 20.7% who were 65 years of age or older. The median age was 38 years. For every 100 females, there were 80.8 males. For every 100 females age 18 and over, there were 79.3 males.

The median income for a household in the city was $18,864, and the median income for a family was $26,875. Males had a median income of $25,000 versus $13,750 for females. The per capita income for the city was $12,626. About 19.8% of families and 18.9% of the population were below the poverty line, including 19.5% of those under age 18 and 19.0% of those age 65 or over.

== Education ==
It is in the Schuyler County R-I School District.

== See also ==
- List of cities in Missouri
