= Grant Township, DeKalb County, Missouri =

Township in Missouri, U.S.

Grant Township
- Township
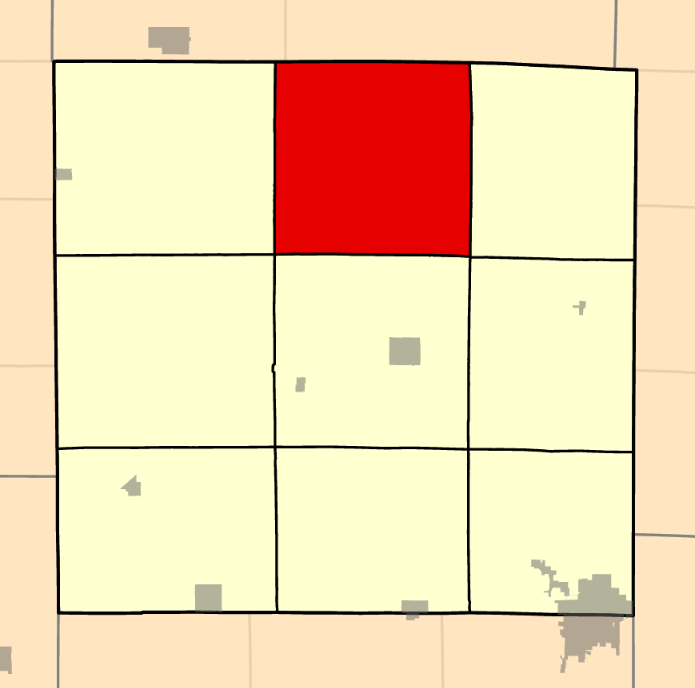
- Coordinates: 39°59′03″N 94°23′02″W
- Country: United States
- State: Missouri
- County: DeKalb

Area
  - Total: 50.53 sq mi (130.9 km^{2})
  - Land: 49.83 sq mi (129.1 km^{2})
  - Water: 0.7 sq mi (1.8 km^{2}) 1.39%
- Elevation: 988 ft (301 m)

Population (2020)
  - Total: 356
  - Density: 7.1/sq mi (2.7/km^{2})
- FIPS code: 29-06328468
- GNIS feature ID: 766596

Grant Township is a township in DeKalb County, Missouri, United States. At the 2020 census, its population was 356.

Grant Township has the name of General Ulysses S. Grant, afterward President of the United States.

== Transportation ==
The following highways travel through the township:

- Route A
- Route E
- Route H
- Route W
