= Grant Township, Stone County, Missouri =

Township in Stone County, Missouri, U.S.

Coordinates: 36.9572°N 93.5664°W

Grant Township is an inactive township in Stone County, in the U.S. state of Missouri.

Grant Township was erected in 1870, taking its name from Ulysses S. Grant, a general in the Civil War and afterward President of the United States.
