= Grant Township, Webster County, Missouri =

Inactive township in the US state of Missouri

Coordinates: 37.3317°N 93.0178°W

Grant Township is an inactive township in Webster County, in the U.S. state of Missouri.

Grant Township was erected in 1871, taking its name from Ulysses S. Grant, 18th President of the United States.
