= Grant Township, Antelope County, Nebraska =

Grant Township
- Township
- Location in Antelope County
- Coordinates: 41°57′34″N 097°53′33″W
- Country: United States
- State: Nebraska
- County: Antelope

Area
  - Total: 35.97 sq mi (93.16 km^{2})
  - Land: 35.97 sq mi (93.16 km^{2})
  - Water: 0 sq mi (0 km^{2}) 0%
- Elevation: 1,824 ft (556 m)

Population (2010)
  - Total: 67
  - Density: 1.8/sq mi (0.7/km^{2})
- GNIS feature ID: 0838033

Grant Township is one of twenty-four townships in Antelope County, Nebraska, United States. The population was 67 at the 2010 census.

== See also ==
- County government in Nebraska
