= Missouri Route 145 =

State highway in Missouri, U.S.

Route 145
- MO 145 highlighted in red

Route information
- Maintained by MoDOT
- Length: 3.148 mi (5.066 km)

Major junctions
- South end: US 136 west of Princeton
- North end: Route B west of Princeton

Location
- Country: United States
- State: Missouri

Highway system
- Missouri State Highway System; Interstate; US; State; Supplemental
← Route 144	→ Route 146

Route 145 is a short highway in Mercer County, Missouri. Its northern terminus is at Route B; its southern terminus is at U.S. Route 136. There are no towns on the route.

== Route description ==
Route 145 begins at an intersection with US 136 west of Princeton, heading north on a two-lane undivided road. The route passes through agricultural areas with some trees, curving northwest and running to the east of Lake Paho. The road heads west and crosses the lake, continuing through more rural areas. Route 145 comes to its northern terminus at an intersection with Route B.

== History ==
This highway was designated as Route 136 by 1950, but was renumbered to Route 145 in 1951 when US 136 was created in Missouri.

== Major intersections ==
The entire route is in Princeton, Mercer County.

mi	km	Destinations	Notes
0.000	0.000	US 136	
3.148	5.066	Route B	
1.000 mi = 1.609 km; 1.000 km = 0.621 mi
