= Grant Township, Dade County, Missouri =

Township in the US state of Missouri

Coordinates: 37.3281°N 94.0181°W

Grant Township is a township in Dade County, in the U.S. state of Missouri.

Grant Township has the name of Ulysses S. Grant, a Civil War officer, and afterward President of the United States.
