= Livonia, Missouri =

- Village
- Location of Livonia, Missouri
- Coordinates: 40°29′31″N 92°42′02″W
- Country: United States
- State: Missouri
- County: Putnam

Area
  - Total: 0.27 sq mi (0.69 km^{2})
  - Land: 0.27 sq mi (0.69 km^{2})
  - Water: 0 sq mi (0.00 km^{2})
- Elevation: 830 ft (250 m)

Population (2020)
  - Total: 52
  - Density: 195.4/sq mi (75.45/km^{2})
- Time zone: UTC-6 (Central (CST))
  - Summer (DST): UTC-5 (CDT)
- ZIP code: 63551
- Area code: 660
- FIPS code: 29-43454
- GNIS feature ID: 2398458

Livonia is a village in eastern Putnam County, Missouri, United States. The population was 52 at the 2020 census.

== History ==
The plat for Livonia was laid out in May 1859 by Absalom Grogan and consisted of four blocks containing eight lots each. Grogan was also the town's first postmaster. Following his death, the post office was moved to the farm of Joseph Martin approximately three miles to the north of the original plat. The town, for all practical purposes, followed this move to higher ground and by 1888 had the post office, Martin's general store, the blacksmith shop of Dan Kelly, and a population of around 15.

On July 26, 2011, the United States Postal Service announced plans to permanently close the Livonia post office as part of a nationwide restructuring plan.

== Geography ==
Livonia is located in southeastern Grant Township on Missouri Route N just north of US Route 136. The Putnam-Schuyler county line is on the Chariton River just to the east of the town. Unionville is approximately 17 miles to the west along Route 136. Lancaster is approximately eleven miles east in Schuyler County.

According to the United States Census Bureau, the village has a total area of 0.27 square miles (0.70 km^{2}), all land.

== Demographics ==
Historical population
Census	Pop.	Note	%±
1920	248		—
1930	237		−4.4%
1940	220		−7.2%
1950	193		−12.3%
1960	154		−20.2%
1970	119		−22.7%
1980	162		36.1%
1990	126		−22.2%
2000	114		−9.5%
2010	74		−35.1%
2020	52		−29.7%
U.S. Decennial Census

=== 2010 census ===
At the 2010 census, there were 74 people, 35 households and 22 families living in the village. The population density was 274.1 per square mile (105.8/km^{2}). There were 47 housing units at an average density of 174.1 per square mile (67.2/km^{2}). The racial make-up of the village was 100.0% White. Hispanic or Latino of any race were 1.4% of the population.

There were 35 households, of which 20.0% had children under the age of 18 living with them, 48.6% were married couples living together, 8.6% had a female householder with no husband present, 5.7% had a male householder with no wife present and 37.1% were non-families. 31.4% of all households were made up of individuals, and 14.3% had someone living alone who was 65 years of age or older. The average household size was 2.11 and the average family size was 2.64.

The median age in the village was 50 years. 13.5% of residents were under the age of 18, 10.9% were between the ages of 18 and 24, 14.9% were from 25 to 44, 44.7% were from 45 to 64 and 16.2% were 65 years of age or older. The sex make-up of the village was 45.9% male and 54.1% female.

=== 2000 census ===
At the 2000 census, there were 114 people, 46 households, and 28 families living in the village. The population density was 428.8 per square mile (165.6/km^{2}). There were 62 housing units at an average density of 233.2 per square mile (90.0/km^{2}). The racial make-up of the village was 95.61% White, 1.75% Native American and 2.63% from two or more races.

There were 46 households, of which 30.4% had children under the age of 18 living with them, 47.8% were married couples living together, 6.5% had a female householder with no husband present and 39.1% were non-families. 30.4% of all households were made up of individuals and 6.5% had someone living alone who was 65 years of age or older. The average household size was 2.48 and the average family size was 3.29.

8.9% of the population were under the age of 18, 7.0% from 18 to 24, 28.9% from 25 to 44, 23.7% from 45 to 64 and 11.4% were 65 years of age or older. The median age was 39 years. For every 100 females, there were 119.2 males. For every 100 females age 18 and over, there were 107.7 males.

The median household income was $22,813 and the median family income was $24,063. Males had a median income of $19,375 and females $23,750. The per capita income was $8,633. There were 36.4% of families and 35.4% of the population living below the poverty line, including 50.0% of under eighteens and none of those over 64.

== Education ==
It is in the Putnam County R-I School District.

== Notable people ==
- Clare Magee, (1899 - 1969), U.S. Congressman Missouri's 1st congressional district (1949-1953); born and raised near Livonia.
