= Grant Township, Mason County, Michigan =

Grant Township, Michigan
- Civil township
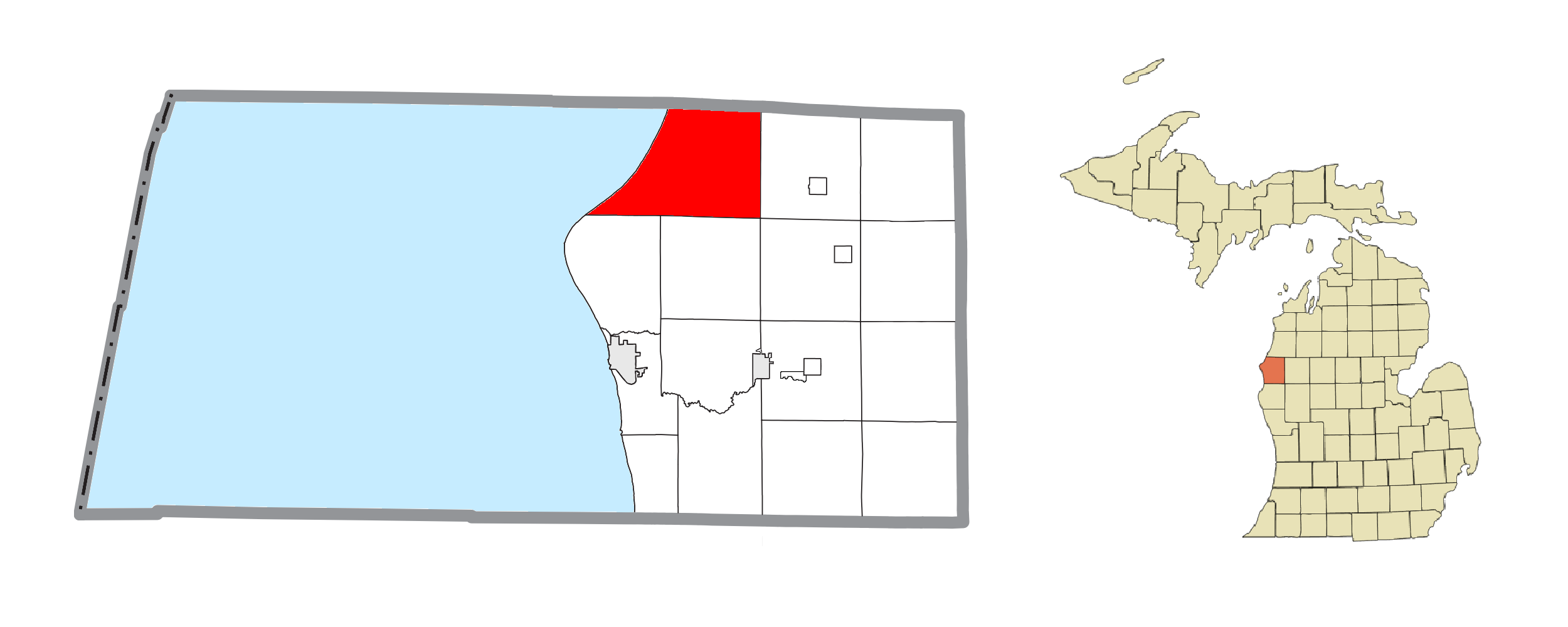
- Location within Mason County

- Location within Michigan Location within the United States
- Coordinates: 44°07′58″N 86°21′36″W
- Country: United States
- State: Michigan
- County: Mason
- Organized: 1867

Government
  - Supervisor: Robert Rakowski
  - Clerk: Mary Jo Janowiak

Area
  - Total: 48.92 sq mi (126.7 km^{2})
  - Land: 48.73 sq mi (126.2 km^{2})
  - Water: 0.19 sq mi (0.49 km^{2})
- Elevation: 663 ft (202 m)

Population (2020)
  - Total: 925
  - Density: 19/sq mi (7.3/km^{2})
- Time zone: UTC-5 (Eastern (EST))
  - Summer (DST): UTC-4 (EDT)
- ZIP Codes: 49411 (Free Soil); 49660 (Manistee); 49431 (Ludington)
- Area code: 231
- FIPS code: 26-105-34320
- GNIS feature ID: 1626382
- Website: granttwpmi.org

Grant Township is a civil township of Mason County in the U.S. state of Michigan. As of the 2020 census, the township population was 925.

The township was named in 1867 for General Ulysses S. Grant, who soon afterward became the 18th president of the United States.

== Geography ==
The township is in northwestern Mason County, bordered to the north by Manistee County and to the west by Lake Michigan. U.S. Route 31 runs north-south along the eastern border of the township. According to the United States Census Bureau, the township has a total area of 48.92 square miles (126.70 km^{2}), of which 48.73 square miles (126.21 km^{2}) are land and 0.19 square miles (0.49 km^{2}), or 0.39%, are water.

The township hall is located on Hoague Road near the intersection of LaSalle Road.

== Demographics ==
As of the census of 2000, there were 850 people, 325 households, and 249 families residing in the township. The population density was 17.5 inhabitants per square mile (6.8/km^{2}). There were 499 housing units at an average density of 10.3 per square mile (4.0/km^{2}). The racial makeup of the township was 95.29% White, 0.24% African American, 1.41% Native American, 1.29% from other races, and 1.76% from two or more races. Hispanic or Latino of any race were 2.59% of the population.

There were 325 households, out of which 32.9% had children under the age of 18 living with them, 64.6% were married couples living together, 7.1% had a female householder with no husband present, and 23.1% were non-families. 17.2% of all households were made up of individuals, and 8.0% had someone living alone who was 65 years of age or older. The average household size was 2.62 and the average family size was 2.93.

In the township the population was spread out, with 24.5% under the age of 18, 6.7% from 18 to 24, 29.2% from 25 to 44, 27.9% from 45 to 64, and 11.8% who were 65 years of age or older. The median age was 41 years. For every 100 females, there were 107.8 males. For every 100 females age 18 and over, there were 106.4 males.

The median income for a household in the township was $39,018, and the median income for a family was $45,000. Males had a median income of $36,389 versus $21,607 for females. The per capita income for the township was $16,611. About 8.2% of families and 11.4% of the population were below the poverty line, including 11.8% of those under age 18 and 9.8% of those age 65 or over.
