= Grant Township, Cuming County, Nebraska =

Grant Township
- Township
- Location in Cuming County
- Coordinates: 42°02′22″N 096°50′29″W
- Country: United States
- State: Nebraska
- County: Cuming

Area
  - Total: 36.00 sq mi (93.23 km^{2})
  - Land: 36.00 sq mi (93.23 km^{2})
  - Water: 0 sq mi (0 km^{2}) 0%
- Elevation: 1,424 ft (434 m)

Population (2020)
  - Total: 113
  - Density: 3.14/sq mi (1.21/km^{2})
- GNIS feature ID: 0838035

Grant Township is one of sixteen townships in Cuming County, Nebraska, United States. The population was 113 at the 2020 census. A 2021 estimate placed the township's population at 112.

== See also ==
- County government in Nebraska
