= Grant Township, Putnam County, Missouri =

Township in Putnam County, Missouri, U.S.

Coordinates: 40.50°N 92.71°W

Grant Township is a township in northeastern Putnam County, Missouri.

The organization date and origin of the name of Grant Township is unknown. The village of Livonia is located in the southeastern area of the township.
