= Putnam County, Missouri =

County in Missouri, United States

- County
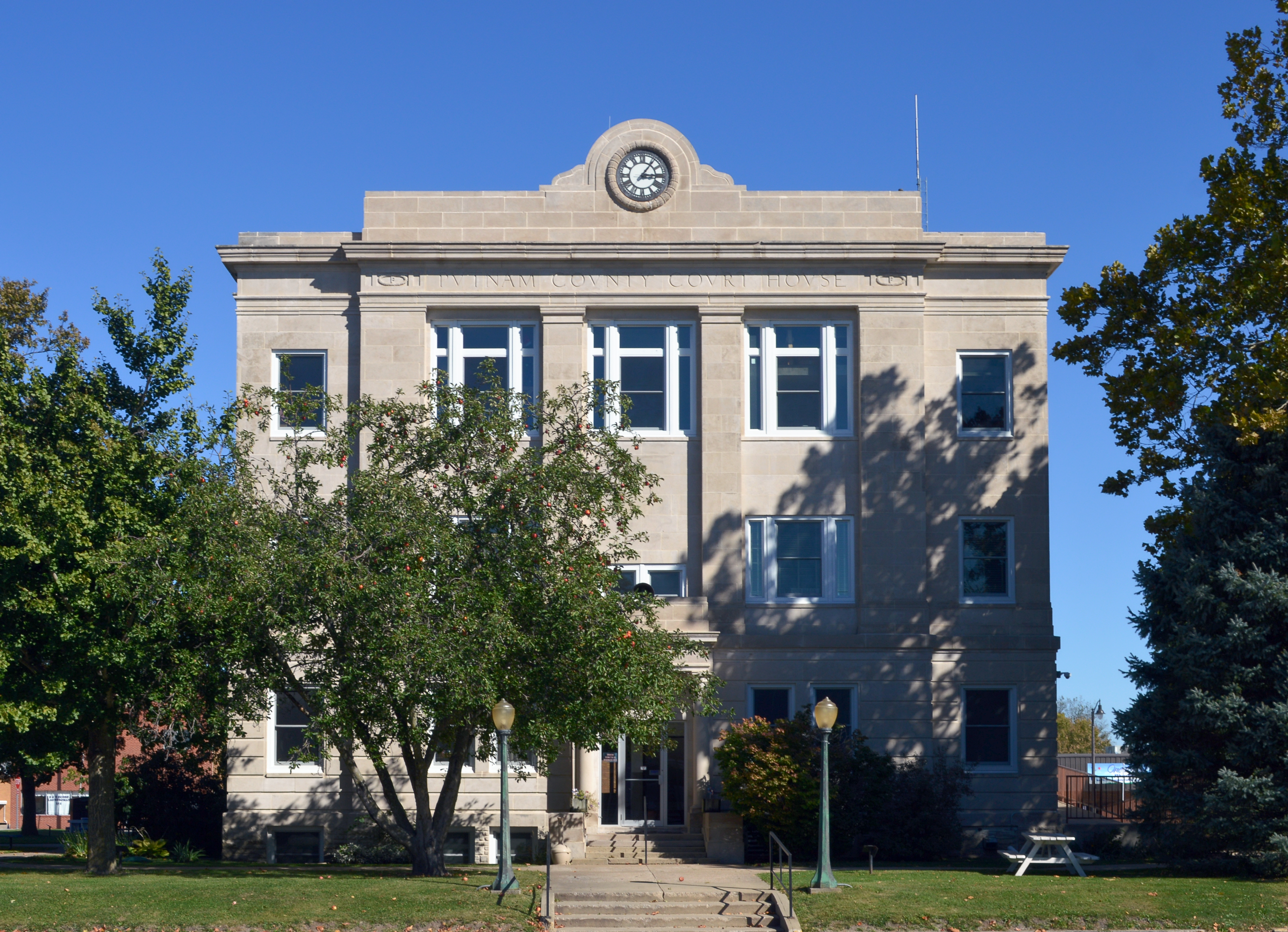
- Putnam County Courthouse in Unionville

- Location within the U.S. state of Missouri
- Coordinates: 40°29′N 93°01′W
- Country: United States
- State: Missouri
- Founded: February 28, 1845
- Named for: Israel Putnam
- Seat: Unionville
- Largest city: Unionville

Area
  - Total: 520 sq mi (1,300 km^{2})
  - Land: 517 sq mi (1,340 km^{2})
  - Water: 2.3 sq mi (6.0 km^{2}) 0.4%

Population (2020)
  - Total: 4,681
  - Estimate (2025): 4,546 ▼
  - Density: 9.05/sq mi (3.50/km^{2})
- Time zone: UTC−6 (Central)
  - Summer (DST): UTC−5 (CDT)
- Congressional district: 6th
- Website: nemr.net/~putco/

Putnam County is a county in north central Missouri. At the 2020 census, the population was 4,681. Its county seat is Unionville. The county was organized February 28, 1845, and named for Israel Putnam, a hero in the French and Indian War and a general in the American Revolutionary War.

Putnam County was established February 28, 1845, from parts of Adair and Sullivan counties. The following year a portion of Putnam was removed to form Dodge County. Both Putnam and Dodge extended nearly nine miles further north until an 1851 ruling by the Supreme Court on a border dispute with Iowa assigned the contested land to Iowa. Both counties were left with less than the statutory minimum area for a county as set by the state legislature, so Dodge County was dissolved and its area added to Putnam.

In its early years, the county seat changed frequently, often with contentious debate. Putnamville, Bryant Station (both no longer in existence), and Hartford all served until a central location called Harmony, later renamed Unionville, was chosen.

In the 1860 U.S. Census Putnam County had 9,240 residents, with eighteen sawmills and three flour mills. Coal had been an abundant since its earliest settlement. Following the arrival of the Burlington & Southwestern Railway in 1873, coal mining became a major industry, especially in the east of the county. At one time three railroads crossed Putnam county: the Chicago, Milwaukee and St. Paul; the Chicago, Burlington and Quincy; and the Iowa and St. Louis. Putnam County lost over two-thirds of its population between 1900 and 2000 (see census data below), when the United States changed from a rural to an urban country.

== Geography ==
According to the U.S. Census Bureau, the county has a total area of 520 square miles (1,300 km^{2}), of which 517 square miles (1,340 km^{2}) is land and 2.3 square miles (6.0 km^{2}) (0.4%) is water.

=== Adjacent counties ===
- Wayne County, Iowa (northwest)
- Appanoose County, Iowa (northeast)
- Schuyler County (east)
- Adair County (southeast)
- Sullivan County (south)
- Mercer County (west)

=== Major highways ===
- U.S. Route 136
- Route 5
- Route 129
- Route 139
- Route 149

== Demographics ==
Historical population
Census	Pop.	Note	%±
1850	1,636		—
1860	9,207		462.8%
1870	11,217		21.8%
1880	13,555		20.8%
1890	15,365		13.4%
1900	16,668		8.5%
1910	14,308		−14.2%
1920	13,115		−8.3%
1930	11,503		−12.3%
1940	11,327		−1.5%
1950	9,166		−19.1%
1960	6,999		−23.6%
1970	5,916		−15.5%
1980	6,092		3.0%
1990	5,079		−16.6%
2000	5,223		2.8%
2010	4,979		−4.7%
2020	4,681		−6.0%
2025 (est.)	4,546	▼	−2.9%
U.S. Decennial Census; 1790-1960 1900-1990; 1990-2000 2010-2015

=== 2020 census ===
As of the 2020 census, the county had a population of 4,681. The median age was 45.7 years, with 21.9% of residents under the age of 18 and 25.6% aged 65 or older. For every 100 females there were 104.5 males, and for every 100 females age 18 and over there were 99.2 males age 18 and over.

There were 2,034 households in the county, of which 26.7% had children under the age of 18 living with them and 22.8% had a female householder with no spouse or partner present. About 31.7% of all households were made up of individuals and 14.9% had someone living alone who was 65 years of age or older.

The county had 2,835 housing units, of which 28.3% were vacant. Among occupied housing units, 76.2% were owner-occupied and 23.8% were renter-occupied, with homeowner and rental vacancy rates of 2.4% and 9.9%, respectively.

The racial makeup of the county was 95.6% White, 0.3% Black or African American, 0.3% American Indian and Alaska Native, 0.1% Asian, 0.0% Native Hawaiian and Pacific Islander, 0.8% from some other race, and 2.9% from two or more races. Hispanic or Latino residents of any race comprised 2.4% of the population.

0.0% of residents lived in urban areas, while 100.0% lived in rural areas.

=== Racial and ethnic composition ===
Putnam County, Missouri – Racial and ethnic composition Note: the US Census treats Hispanic/Latino as an ethnic category. This table excludes Latinos from the racial categories and assigns them to a separate category. Hispanics/Latinos may be of any race.
Race / Ethnicity (NH = Non-Hispanic)	Pop 1980	Pop 1990	Pop 2000	Pop 2010	Pop 2020	% 1980	% 1990	% 2000	% 2010	% 2020
White alone (NH)	6,038	5,042	5,155	4,865	4,446	99.11%	99.27%	98.70%	97.71%	94.98%
Black or African American alone (NH)	0	1	3	9	11	0.00%	0.02%	0.06%	0.18%	0.23%
Native American or Alaska Native alone (NH)	12	8	5	7	5	0.20%	0.16%	0.10%	0.14%	0.11%
Asian alone (NH)	3	4	7	22	0	0.05%	0.08%	0.13%	0.44%	0.00%
Native Hawaiian or Pacific Islander alone (NH)	x	x	0	1	0	x	x	0.00%	0.02%	0.00%
Other race alone (NH)	1	0	0	0	0	0.02%	0.00%	0.00%	0.00%	0.00%
Mixed race or Multiracial (NH)	x	x	21	39	107	x	x	0.40%	0.78%	2.29%
Hispanic or Latino (any race)	38	24	32	36	112	0.62%	0.47%	0.61%	0.72%	2.39%
Total	6,092	5,079	5,223	4,979	4,681	100.00%	100.00%	100.00%	100.00%	100.00%

=== 2010 census ===
As of the census of 2010, there were 4,979 people, 2,228 households, and 1,517 families residing in the county. The population density was 10 people per square mile (3.9 people/km^{2}). There were 2,914 housing units at an average density of 6 per square mile (2.3/km^{2}). The racial makeup of the county was 99.14% White, 0.06% Black or African American, 0.10% Native American, 0.13% Asian, 0.10% from other races, and 0.48% from two or more races. Approximately 0.61% of the population were Hispanic or Latino of any race.

There were 2,228 households, out of which 27.90% had children under the age of 18 living with them, 57.20% were married couples living together, 7.20% had a female householder with no husband present, and 31.90% were non-families. 28.70% of all households were made up of individuals, and 15.90% had someone living alone who was 65 years of age or older. The average household size was 2.32 and the average family size was 2.83.

In the county, the population was spread out, with 24.00% under the age of 18, 6.20% from 18 to 24, 24.00% from 25 to 44, 25.10% from 45 to 64, and 20.70% who were 65 years of age or older. The median age was 42 years. For every 100 females there were 96.10 males. For every 100 females age 18 and over, there were 91.90 males.

The median income for a household in the county was $26,282, and the median income for a family was $32,031. Males had a median income of $22,957 versus $18,884 for females. The per capita income for the county was $14,647. About 13.20% of families and 16.00% of the population were below the poverty line, including 20.60% of those under age 18 and 12.80% of those age 65 or over.

== Education ==
School districts which cover portions of the county include:

- Putnam County R-I School District
- Newtown-Harris R-III School District
- Schuyler County R-I School District

=== Public schools ===
All of these schools are operated by Putnam County R-I School District:

- Putnam County Elementary School (PK-05)
- Putnam County Middle School (06-08)
- Putnam County High School (09-12)

=== Public libraries ===
- Putnam County Public Library

== Communities ==
=== City ===
- Unionville (county seat)

=== Villages ===
- Livonia
- Lucerne
- Powersville
- Worthington

=== Unincorporated communities ===
- Chapel
- Chariton
- Elko
- Esper
- Galesburg
- Glendale
- Graysville
- Hartford
- Lemons
- Martinstown
- Omaha
- Quinn
- Rosewood
- St. John
- Sidney
- Wyreka

=== Townships ===
- Elm
- Grant
- Jackson
- Liberty
- Lincoln
- Medicine
- Richland
- Sherman
- Union
- Wilson
- York

== Politics ==
=== Local ===
The Republican Party predominantly controls politics at the local level in Putnam County. Republicans hold all but one of the elected positions in the county.

Putnam County, Missouri

Elected countywide officials
Assessor	Chrissy Gillis	Democratic
Circuit Clerk	Leslie Ream	Republican
County Clerk	Christy Brooks	Republican
Collector	Jennifer Heidenwith	Republican
Commissioner (presiding)	Robert Munden	Republican
Commissioner (district 1)	Shane Bradshaw	Republican
Commissioner (district 2)	Gerald Owings	Republican
Coroner	Anna Fleshman	Republican
Prosecuting Attorney	Michael Wulff	Republican
Public Administrator	Ami Hartwig	Republican
Recorder	Dotsy Wood	Republican
Sheriff	Jason Knight	Republican
Treasurer	Jennifer Heidenwith	Republican

=== State ===
Past Gubernatorial Elections Results
Year	Republican	Democratic	Third Parties
2024	85.18% 1,988	12.68% 296	2.14% 50
2020	85.15% 1,984	13.86% 323	0.99% 23
2016	73.84% 1,691	23.89% 547	2.27% 52
2012	65.53% 1,485	32.04% 726	2.43% 55
2008	64.43% 1,467	32.85% 748	2.72% 62
2004	72.75% 1,757	25.84% 624	1.41% 34
2000	66.42% 1,531	32.62% 752	0.95% 22
1996	41.71% 898	56.71% 1,332	1.58% 34

All of Putnam County is a part of Missouri's 3rd District in the Missouri House of Representatives and is represented by Nate Walker (R-Kirksville).

Missouri House of Representatives — District 3 — Putnam County (2016)
Party	Candidate	Votes	%	±%
Republican	Nate Walker	2,067	100.00%	

Missouri House of Representatives — District 3 — Putnam County (2014)
Party	Candidate	Votes	%	±%
Republican	Nate Walker	1,059	100.00%	+30.20

Missouri House of Representatives — District 3 — Putnam County (2012)
Party	Candidate	Votes	%	±%
Republican	Nate Walker	1,597	69.80%	
Democratic	Rebecca McClanahan	691	30.20%	

All of Putnam County is a part of Missouri's 12th District in the Missouri Senate and is currently represented by Dan Hegeman (R-Cosby).

Missouri Senate — District 12 — Putnam County (2014)
Party	Candidate	Votes	%	±%
Republican	Dan Hegeman	1,036	100.00%	

=== Federal ===
U.S. Senate — Missouri — Putnam County (2016)
Party	Candidate	Votes	%	±%
Republican	Roy Blunt	1,708	74.88%	+18.11
Democratic	Jason Kander	486	21.31%	−17.89
Libertarian	Jonathan Dine	46	2.02%	−2.01
Green	Johnathan McFarland	24	1.05%	+1.05
Constitution	Fred Ryman	17	0.74%	+0.74

U.S. Senate — Missouri — Putnam County (2012)
Party	Candidate	Votes	%	±%
Republican	Todd Akin	1,296	56.77%	
Democratic	Claire McCaskill	895	39.20%	
Libertarian	Jonathan Dine	92	4.03%	

All of Putnam County is included in Missouri's 6th Congressional District and is currently represented by Sam Graves (R-Tarkio) in the U.S. House of Representatives.

U.S. House of Representatives — Missouri's 6th Congressional District — Putnam County (2016)
Party	Candidate	Votes	%	±%
Republican	Sam Graves	1,897	84.01%	+0.52
Democratic	David M. Blackwell	315	13.95%	−0.84
Libertarian	Russ Lee Monchil	32	1.42%	−1.98
Green	Mike Diel	14	0.62%	+0.62

U.S. House of Representatives — Missouri’s 6th Congressional District — Putnam County (2014)
Party	Candidate	Votes	%	±%
Republican	Sam Graves	1,032	83.49%	+3.36
Democratic	Bill Hedge	162	13.11%	−4.22
Libertarian	Russ Lee Monchil	42	3.40%	+0.86

U.S. House of Representatives — Missouri's 6th Congressional District — Putnam County (2012)
Party	Candidate	Votes	%	±%
Republican	Sam Graves	1,799	80.13%	
Democratic	Kyle Yarber	389	17.33%	
Libertarian	Russ Lee Monchil	57	2.54%	

United States presidential election results for Putnam County, Missouri
Year	Republican		Democratic		Third party(ies)	
Year	No.	%	No.	%	No.	%
1888	1,985	63.95%	1,045	33.67%	74	2.38%
1892	2,027	62.24%	1,131	34.73%	99	3.04%
1896	2,363	62.93%	1,376	36.64%	16	0.43%
1900	2,337	65.46%	1,159	32.46%	74	2.07%
1904	2,226	68.45%	822	25.28%	204	6.27%
1908	2,233	65.77%	1,056	31.10%	106	3.12%
1912	1,859	55.71%	933	27.96%	545	16.33%
1916	2,106	64.84%	1,035	31.87%	107	3.29%
1920	3,880	72.92%	1,315	24.71%	126	2.37%
1924	3,340	65.39%	1,495	29.27%	273	5.34%
1928	3,498	73.56%	1,247	26.23%	10	0.21%
1932	2,180	50.52%	1,987	46.05%	148	3.43%
1936	3,458	64.01%	1,902	35.21%	42	0.78%
1940	3,828	68.84%	1,708	30.71%	25	0.45%
1944	3,106	72.55%	1,168	27.28%	7	0.16%
1948	2,499	62.84%	1,463	36.79%	15	0.38%
1952	3,202	73.31%	1,149	26.30%	17	0.39%
1956	2,674	70.57%	1,115	29.43%	0	0.00%
1960	2,711	71.89%	1,060	28.11%	0	0.00%
1964	1,547	51.04%	1,484	48.96%	0	0.00%
1968	1,971	63.75%	952	30.79%	169	5.47%
1972	2,112	78.72%	571	21.28%	0	0.00%
1976	1,444	56.63%	1,097	43.02%	9	0.35%
1980	1,722	64.86%	871	32.81%	62	2.34%
1984	1,540	65.90%	797	34.10%	0	0.00%
1988	1,365	62.73%	803	36.90%	8	0.37%
1992	1,143	45.67%	838	33.48%	522	20.85%
1996	1,091	48.60%	857	38.17%	297	13.23%
2000	1,593	68.25%	708	30.33%	33	1.41%
2004	1,660	67.89%	772	31.57%	13	0.53%
2008	1,591	68.02%	695	29.71%	53	2.27%
2012	1,673	72.46%	587	25.42%	49	2.12%
2016	1,936	82.52%	353	15.05%	57	2.43%
2020	1,984	84.03%	361	15.29%	16	0.68%
2024	2,021	84.92%	347	14.58%	12	0.50%

== See also ==
- National Register of Historic Places listings in Putnam County, Missouri
- Putnam County, New York
