= Unionville, Missouri =

City in Missouri, U.S.

- City
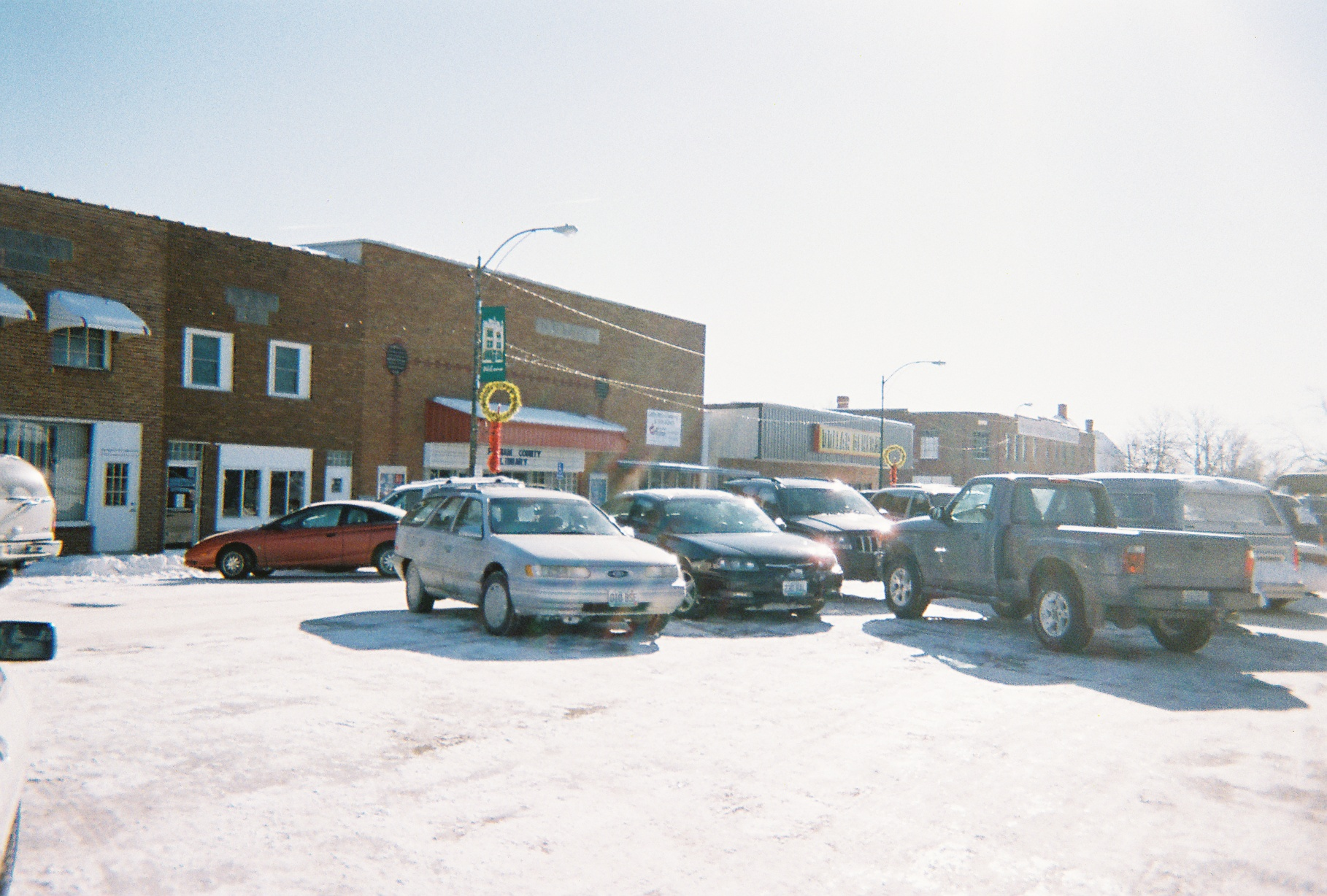
- Unionville Square

- Location of Unionville, Missouri
- Coordinates: 40°28′35″N 93°00′16″W
- Country: United States
- State: Missouri
- County: Putnam

Area
  - Total: 2.00 sq mi (5.17 km^{2})
  - Land: 2.00 sq mi (5.17 km^{2})
  - Water: 0 sq mi (0.00 km^{2})
- Elevation: 1,047 ft (319 m)

Population (2020)
  - Total: 1,735
  - Density: 869.0/sq mi (335.54/km^{2})
- Time zone: UTC−6 (Central (CST))
  - Summer (DST): UTC−5 (CDT)
- ZIP code: 63565
- Area code: 660
- FIPS code: 29-75166
- GNIS feature ID: 2397090
- Website: www.unionvillemo.org

Unionville is a city in Putnam County, Missouri, United States. The population was 1,735 at the 2020 census. It is the county seat of Putnam County.

== History ==
Unionville was first named Harmony when established in 1853 as the county seat for Putnam County. Prior to that the county seat had moved several times, often with heated debate, thus the centralized location hoping to bring "harmony" to all concerned. (see Putnam County history for more details)

The Union Township trustees first met on February 4, 1873, at the court-house in Unionville. Since that day, Unionville straddles the municipal border between Union Township and Wilson Township.

On May 22, 1962, Continental Airlines Flight 11, en route from O'Hare Airport in Chicago, Illinois to the downtown Kansas City, Missouri airport, crashed in a clover field north of Unionville, near Lake Thunderhead, killing all 37 passengers and 8 crew. Investigators subsequently determined that one of the jetliner's passengers, Thomas G. Doty, detonated a bomb inside the Boeing 707 in a suicide-for-insurance plot.

On June 10, 2026, a large tornado landed in and near Unionville. Damage, as well as possible casualties was reported by local law enforcement and by the National Weather Service, and KTVO, a TV station in Kirksville, MO. See the Tornadoes of 2026, Re.: June 10, 2026 article for more information and tornado for more information.

== Demographics ==
Historical population
Census	Pop.	Note	%±
1860	227		—
1870	462		103.5%
1880	772		67.1%
1890	1,118		44.8%
1900	2,050		83.4%
1910	2,000		−2.4%
1920	1,765		−11.7%
1930	1,811		2.6%
1940	2,052		13.3%
1950	2,050		−0.1%
1960	1,896		−7.5%
1970	2,075		9.4%
1980	2,178		5.0%
1990	1,989		−8.7%
2000	2,041		2.6%
2010	1,865		−8.6%
2020	1,735		−7.0%
U.S. Decennial Census

=== 2020 census ===
As of the 2020 census, Unionville had a population of 1,735. The median age was 39.9 years. 23.2% of residents were under the age of 18 and 23.4% of residents were 65 years of age or older. For every 100 females there were 93.0 males, and for every 100 females age 18 and over there were 83.6 males age 18 and over.

0.0% of residents lived in urban areas, while 100.0% lived in rural areas.

There were 798 households in Unionville, of which 26.6% had children under the age of 18 living in them. Of all households, 35.8% were married-couple households, 23.8% were households with a male householder and no spouse or partner present, and 34.5% were households with a female householder and no spouse or partner present. About 42.6% of all households were made up of individuals and 21.2% had someone living alone who was 65 years of age or older.

There were 949 housing units, of which 15.9% were vacant. The homeowner vacancy rate was 4.0% and the rental vacancy rate was 10.0%. The population density was 867.2 inhabitants per square mile (360.0/km2), and there were 949 housing units at an average density of 450.4 per square mile (194.8/km2).

Racial composition as of the 2020 census
Race	Number	Percent
White	1,603	92.4%
Black or African American	8	0.5%
American Indian and Alaska Native	14	0.8%
Asian	1	0.1%
Native Hawaiian and Other Pacific Islander	0	0.0%
Some other race	30	1.7%
Two or more races	79	4.6%
Hispanic or Latino (of any race)	75	4.3%

=== 2010 census ===
As of the census of 2010, there were 1,865 people, 844 households, and 468 families living in the city. The population density was 932.5 inhabitants per square mile (360.0/km^{2}). There were 1,009 housing units at an average density of 504.5 per square mile (194.8/km^{2}). The racial makeup of the city was 97.1% White, 0.4% African American, 0.2% Native American, 0.7% Asian, 0.3% from other races, and 1.3% from two or more races. Hispanic or Latino of any race were 1.2% of the population.

There were 844 households, of which 28.6% had children under the age of 18 living with them, 39.2% were married couples living together, 12.2% had a female householder with no husband present, 4.0% had a male householder with no wife present, and 44.5% were non-families. 40.4% of all households were made up of individuals, and 21% had someone living alone who was 65 years of age or older. The average household size was 2.14 and the average family size was 2.86.

The median age in the city was 41.8 years. 24.2% of residents were under the age of 18; 7.4% were between the ages of 18 and 24; 21.9% were from 25 to 44; 23.9% were from 45 to 64; and 22.6% were 65 years of age or older. The gender makeup of the city was 46.5% male and 53.5% female.

=== 2000 census ===
As of the census of 2000, there were 2,041 people, 913 households, and 530 families living in the city. The population density was 1,025.0 inhabitants per square mile (395.8/km^{2}). There were 1,048 housing units at an average density of 526.3 per square mile (203.2/km^{2}). The racial makeup of the city was 99.17% White, 0.05% African American, 0.10% Asian, 0.15% from other races, and 0.54% from two or more races. Hispanic or Latino of any race were 1.03% of the population.

There were 913 households, out of which 26.8% had children under the age of 18 living with them, 43.6% were married couples living together, 10.3% had a female householder with no husband present, and 41.9% were non-families. 38.6% of all households were made up of individuals, and 22.6% had someone living alone who was 65 years of age or older. The average household size was 2.17 and the average family size was 2.89.

In the city the population was spread out, with 24.2% under the age of 18, 8.1% from 18 to 24, 22.5% from 25 to 44, 19.8% from 45 to 64, and 25.4% who were 65 years of age or older. The median age was 40 years. For every 100 females, there were 85.2 males. For every 100 females age 18 and over, there were 77.9 males.

The median income for a household in the city was $19,978, and the median income for a family was $28,796. Males had a median income of $22,402 versus $16,741 for females. The per capita income for the city was $11,881. About 18.7% of families and 18.6% of the population were below the poverty line, including 21.3% of those under age 18 and 13.8% of those age 65 or over.

== Geography and climate ==
Unionville is located in central Putnam County at the intersection of US Route 136 and Missouri Route 5. Lake Thunderhead on North Blackbird Creek lies to the northwest of the city and the Missouri-Iowa border is seven miles north.

According to the United States Census Bureau, the city has a total area of 2.00 square miles (5.18 km^{2}), all of it land.

Climate data for Unionville, Missouri (1991–2020 normals, extremes 1893–present)
Month	Jan	Feb	Mar	Apr	May	Jun	Jul	Aug	Sep	Oct	Nov	Dec	Year
Record high °F (°C)	70 (21)	80 (27)	89 (32)	94 (34)	104 (40)	105 (41)	113 (45)	114 (46)	106 (41)	98 (37)	86 (30)	73 (23)	114 (46)
Mean daily maximum °F (°C)	32.1 (0.1)	37.5 (3.1)	50.1 (10.1)	61.7 (16.5)	71.4 (21.9)	81.0 (27.2)	85.5 (29.7)	83.8 (28.8)	76.4 (24.7)	63.7 (17.6)	49.5 (9.7)	37.2 (2.9)	60.8 (16.0)
Daily mean °F (°C)	23.5 (−4.7)	27.8 (−2.3)	39.4 (4.1)	50.6 (10.3)	61.6 (16.4)	71.2 (21.8)	75.5 (24.2)	73.6 (23.1)	65.5 (18.6)	53.1 (11.7)	39.8 (4.3)	28.7 (−1.8)	50.9 (10.5)
Mean daily minimum °F (°C)	14.8 (−9.6)	18.1 (−7.7)	28.7 (−1.8)	39.4 (4.1)	51.8 (11.0)	61.3 (16.3)	65.6 (18.7)	63.5 (17.5)	54.5 (12.5)	42.5 (5.8)	30.2 (−1.0)	20.3 (−6.5)	40.9 (4.9)
Record low °F (°C)	−28 (−33)	−28 (−33)	−14 (−26)	8 (−13)	20 (−7)	38 (3)	44 (7)	37 (3)	25 (−4)	−3 (−19)	−10 (−23)	−29 (−34)	−29 (−34)
Average precipitation inches (mm)	1.35 (34)	1.69 (43)	2.60 (66)	3.80 (97)	6.04 (153)	5.62 (143)	4.64 (118)	5.29 (134)	3.52 (89)	3.15 (80)	2.32 (59)	1.91 (49)	41.93 (1,065)
Average snowfall inches (cm)	6.0 (15)	9.9 (25)	3.0 (7.6)	1.2 (3.0)	0.4 (1.0)	0.0 (0.0)	0.0 (0.0)	0.0 (0.0)	0.0 (0.0)	0.5 (1.3)	1.9 (4.8)	5.8 (15)	28.7 (73)
Average precipitation days (≥ 0.01 in)	6.1	7.0	8.4	10.3	11.9	10.0	8.6	9.0	7.9	8.5	6.6	7.3	101.6
Average snowy days (≥ 0.1 in)	3.0	4.0	1.4	0.4	0.0	0.0	0.0	0.0	0.0	0.2	0.8	3.4	13.2
Source: NOAA

== Education ==
Public education in Unionville is administered by Putnam County R-I School District. Unionville has a lending library, the Putnam County Public Library.

== Notable people ==
- Rankin Gibson - Ohio State Supreme Court Justice
- Bill Jackson - Children's TV host and cartoonist.
- Clare Magee - former U.S. Congressman
- John C. McKinley - former Missouri Lieutenant Governor.
- Orval Hobart Mowrer - American psychologist
- James K. Weatherford (1850–1935) - Oregon attorney and politician

== See also ==
- List of cities in Missouri
