= National Register of Historic Places listings in Clark County, Missouri =

Location of Clark County in Missouri

This is a list of the National Register of Historic Places listings in Clark County, Missouri.

This is intended to be a complete list of the properties and districts on the National Register of Historic Places in Clark County, Missouri, United States. Latitude and longitude coordinates are provided for many National Register properties and districts; these locations may be seen together in a map.

There are 6 properties and districts listed on the National Register in the county.

This National Park Service list is complete through NPS recent listings posted January 23, 2026.

== Current listings ==
	Name on the Register	Image	Date listed	Location	City or town	Description
1	Boulware Mound Group Archeological Site	Boulware Mound Group Archeological Site	January 21, 1970 (#70000328)	By the U.S. Route 61 roadside park 10 miles (16 km) north of Canton; 40°15′55″N 91°33′06″W	Canton	
2	Clark County Courthouse	Clark County Courthouse	September 8, 1983 (#83000976)	101 E. Court St. 40°25′30″N 91°43′48″W	Kahoka	Demolished following a 2010 vote.
3	James Henning House		January 29, 2026 (#100012641)	21408 County Road 198; 40°26′56″N 91°33′44″W	St. Francisville	
4	Col. Hiram M. Hiller House		July 21, 1986 (#86001927)	520 N. Washington; 40°25′30″N 91°43′20″W	Kahoka	
5	Montgomery Opera House	Montgomery Opera House	October 20, 1988 (#88002018)	201-209 W. Commercial St. 40°24′44″N 91°43′20″W	Kahoka	
6	Sickles Tavern	Sickles Tavern	October 22, 1979 (#79001357)	Northwest of Wayland on Route B 40°26′26″N 91°36′14″W	Wayland	

== See also ==
- List of National Historic Landmarks in Missouri
- National Register of Historic Places listings in Missouri
