= Folker Township, Clark County, Missouri =

Township in the US state of Missouri

Coordinates: 40.541042°N 91.888216°W

Folker Township is an inactive township in Clark County, in the U.S. state of Missouri.

Folker Township was established in 1868, taking its name from the local Folker family.

Burnt Shirt Branch, Elm Branch, Fox River, Linn Creek, Mantle Branch and Wyaconda River, among others, run through this township.
