= Waterloo, Clark County, Missouri =

Unincorporated community in Missouri, U.S.

Waterloo, Missouri
- Unincorporated community
- Location within Missouri
- Coordinates: 40°26′58″N 91°40′08″W
- Country: United States
- State: Missouri
- County: Clark
- Elevation: 554 ft (169 m)
- Time zone: UTC-6 (Central (CST))
  - Summer (DST): UTC-5 (CDT)
- Area code: 660
- GNIS feature ID: 755469

Waterloo is a community in Clark County, Missouri, United States. The community is located on a sharp meander in the Fox River. Nearby towns include Kahoka (3 miles southwest), Revere (2.5 miles north) and Wayland (6 miles southeast).

A post office called Waterloo was established in 1837, and remained in operation until 1876. Waterloo held the first county seat.
