= Hiller House =

Hiller House may refer to:

in the United States (by state)

- Col. Hiram M. Hiller House, Kahoka, Missouri, listed on the National Register of Historic Places in Clark County, Missouri
- Robinson-Hiller House, Chapin, South Carolina, NRHP-listed
- Hiller House (N. Vine, Victoria, Texas), listed on the National Register of Historic Places in Victoria County, Texas
- Hiller House (E. Church, Victoria, Texas), listed on the National Register of Historic Places in Victoria County, Texas
