= Dumas Creek =

Stream in the US state of Missouri

Dumas Creek is a stream in Clark County, Missouri. It is a tributary on the west side of the Des Moines River and Lee County, Iowa lies across the river.

The stream headwaters arise about one half mile east of Missouri Route 81 at 40°32′10″N 91°43′02″W. The stream flows southeast passing northeast of Peaksville and crossing under Missouri Route DD. Northeast of Revere the stream turns to the northeast for two miles then east to its confluence with the Des Moines River is at 40°31′20″N 91°37′17″W. The Atchison, Topeka and Santa Fe Railroad line follows the stream valley from northeast of Revere to the confluence.

Dumas Creek derives its name from one Mr. Dumass, an early settler.

== See also ==
- List of rivers of Missouri
