= William H. Spurgeon =

American politician

William Henry Spurgeon
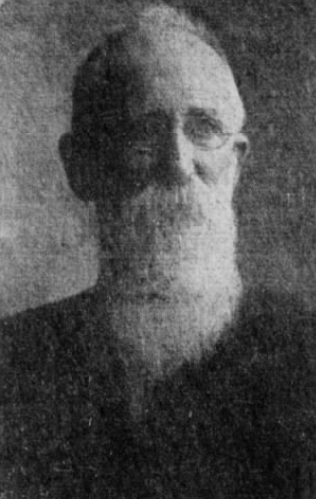
- Spurgeon in 1909 at age 79

Member of the California State Assembly from the 78th district
- In office January 3, 1887 – January 7, 1889
- Preceded by: E. E. Edwards
- Succeeded by: E. E. Edwards

Member of the Los Angeles County Board of Supervisors from the 4th district
- In office 1876–1858
- Preceded by: Edward Evey
- Succeeded by: James D. Ott

Mayor of Santa Ana
- In office June 1, 1886 – August 1, 1889
- Preceded by: Office Established
- Succeeded by: Not known

Member of the Orange County Board of Supervisors from the 1st district
- In office August 5, 1889 – January 5, 1891
- Preceded by: Office Established
- Succeeded by: Joseph Yoch

Chair of the Orange County Board of Supervisors
- In office August 5, 1889 – January 5, 1891
- Preceded by: Office Established
- Succeeded by: Joseph Yoch

Personal details
- Born: October 10, 1829 Henry County, Kentucky, United States
- Died: June 20, 1915 (aged 85) Santa Ana, California, United States
- Resting place: Fairhaven Memorial Park
- Party: Democratic
- Children: 5
- Known for: Founder and first Mayor of Santa Ana, California, first Chair of the Orange County Board of Supervisors

William Henry Spurgeon, also known as Uncle Billy, (October 10, 1829 – June 20, 1915) is credited with founding the city of Santa Ana, California. Spurgeon was also the first mayor of the city.

== Early life and frequent travel ==
William Henry Spurgeon's father was Granville Spurgeon, a farmer from Henry County, Kentucky. Spurgeon was born in October 1829. The family left Kentucky to relocate to Bartholomew County, Indiana in 1830. In 1840, the family relocated to Clark County, Missouri. The family continued to farm and Spurgeon attended school. When he turned 16, he worked as a store clerk in Alexandria, Missouri. He expressed strong interest in relocating to California when the California Gold Rush happened. He left Missouri and traveled to New Orleans. From there, he traveled to the Isthmus of Panama before arriving in California. While in California, he worked in the gold mines. He fought in the Rogue River Wars. He left California in 1856, after making decent money in gold mining. He traveled back through Panama and ended in New York City. He then returned to Missouri, settling in Athens. Spurgeon married Martha Moreland at some point during his life outside of California.

== Life in Santa Ana ==
In 1864, Spurgeon helped his family relocate from Missouri to Solano County, California. In 1867, he went to Los Angeles. His wife died in Los Angeles. He went back to Clark County, Missouri. He went back to California in 1869. He settled in the area now known as Santa Ana. He founded the city with approximately $1,000. He acquired 76-acres of land from the Rancho Santiago de Santa Ana. From there, he designed and founded the city of Santa Ana. He remarried, Jennie English, on April 14, 1872.

He was frustrated with the lack of trees and excessive amounts of high growing mustard plants throughout the area. To rectify the problem, Spurgeon purchased sycamore trees for Santa Ana. In order to transport the trees, he built his own road, cutting through the mustard plants. After that, he built the first general store in Santa Ana, out of redwood lumber. The general store started out with a very small inventory, but over time, as the population grew, the store became larger and more successful. The store and starting area of Santa Ana made Spurgeon a well-known figure in the region. Spurgeon worked as an agent for Wells Fargo and also was postmaster for the town. Eventually, the first board meeting was held for Santa Ana. Spurgeon was chosen as the president of the board.

Spurgeon founded the First National Bank of Santa Ana. He served as president of the bank, the Santa Ana Gas Company, and the Santa Ana Valley Irrigation Company. He donated the land for the depot where the Santa Ana Regional Transportation Center now exists. He had a walnut farm. He was a Democrat. He represented Los Angeles County on the California State Assembly for the 78th district from 1887 to 1889. He was also county supervisor, prior to the founding of Orange County. After the creation of Orange County, he served as supervisor for that county, too.

== Later life and death ==
On February 24, 1909, Spurgeon incorporated his properties as W.H. Spurgeon Realty Company. The company created the W.H. Spurgeon Block in downtown Santa Ana. That building was the largest building in Santa Ana at the time. He served as president until his death. He died on June 20, 1915.

== See also ==
- William H. Spurgeon III
