= Winchester, Clark County, Missouri =

Unincorporated community in Missouri, U.S.

Coordinates: 40°19′04″N 91°36′41″W

Winchester is an unincorporated community in eastern Clark County, in the U.S. state of Missouri.

The community is located on Missouri Route H 1.5 miles west of US Route 61. Wayland is approximately five miles to the north and the community of Antioch is four miles to the west.

== History ==
Winchester was platted in 1837, and most likely was named after Winchester, Virginia. A post office called Winchester was established in 1840, and remained in operation until 1905.
