= Dumas, Missouri =

Unincorporated community in Missouri, U.S.

Coordinates: 40°31′16″N 91°38′08″W

Dumas is an unincorporated community in Clark County, in the U.S. state of Missouri. The community was located along the banks of Dumas Creek just west (upstream) of the confluence with the Des Moines River. The Atchison, Topeka and Santa Fe Railroad line was adjacent to the community site. Revere lies to the southwest of the location and Argyle, Iowa lies to the northeast along the rail line.

== History ==
Dumas was laid out in 1888, and named after nearby Dumas Creek. A post office called Dumas was established in 1888, and remained in operation until 1917.
