= Ashton, Missouri =

Unincorporated community in Missouri, U.S.

Coordinates: 40°26′46″N 91°48′28″W

Ashton is an unincorporated community in Clark County, in the U.S. state of Missouri.

The community is on US Route 136 approximately five miles west of Kahoka and four miles east of Luray. The Fox Valley Lake Conservation Area lies adjacent to the northwest.

== History ==
A post office called Ashton was established in 1851, and remained in operation until 1954. The community takes its name from that of a pioneer citizen.

In 1925, Ashton had 210 inhabitants.
