= Hiram M. Hiller Jr. =

American physician

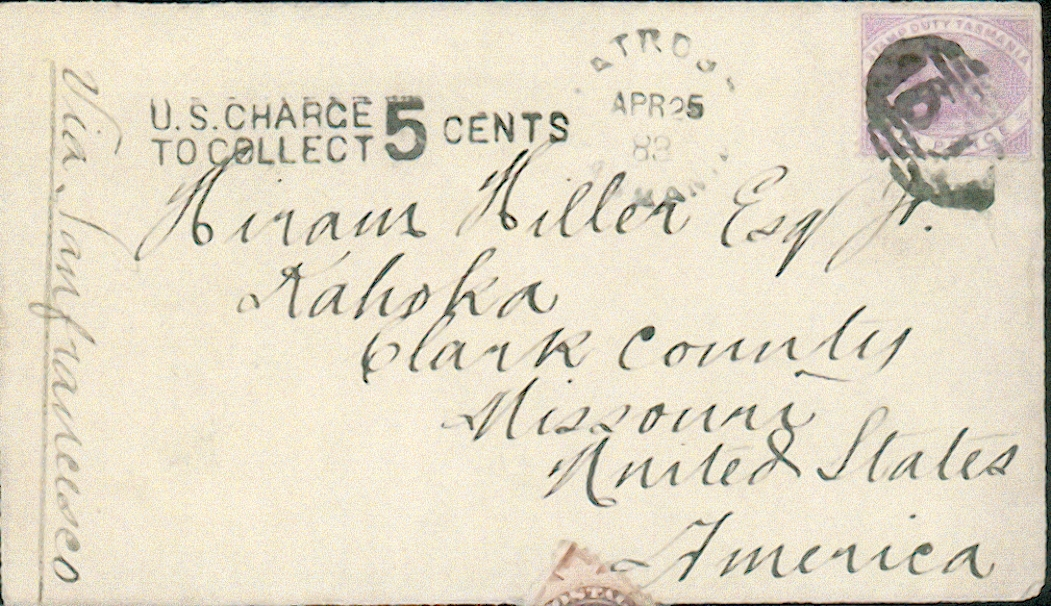
Hiller's interest in the South Seas must have begun early in his life, as shown by this letter to him from Latrobe, Tasmania, postmarked April 25, 1883, when he was 16.

Hiram Milliken Hiller Jr. (March 8, 1867 – August 8, 1921) was an American physician, medical missionary, explorer, and ethnographer. He traveled in Oceania and in South, Southeast, and East Asia, returning with archeological, cultural, zoological, and botanical specimens and data for museums, lectures and publications. His notes and collections provide valuable information about those regions and their people from the late 19th century. In later life, he was involved in the study of polio during the epidemics that hit the United States in the early 20th century.

== Family and early life ==
He was born on March 8, 1867, near Kahoka, Missouri, to Colonel Hiram Milliken Hiller Sr. (1834–1895) and the former Sarah Fulton Bell (1837–1915), who were both from Pennsylvania. He was the third of their six children who survived to adulthood. The elder Hiller, a Civil War veteran and lawyer, was a prominent citizen of Clark County, Missouri, and was instrumental in the success of Kahoka until his death in a railroad accident. His house in Kahoka is a registered historic landmark.

The younger Hiller attended Parsons College in Iowa, earning his B.S. in 1887. He moved to Philadelphia to attend medical school at the University of Pennsylvania. While there, he met several other men of similar interests, including William Henry Furness III (1867–1920, the son of Shakespearean scholar Horace Howard Furness and nephew of architect Frank Furness), and Alfred Craven Harrison Jr. (1869–1925, nephew of Charles Custis Harrison, Provost of the University of Pennsylvania from 1894 to 1911). Hiller graduated in 1891 and served his residency at the University of Pennsylvania Hospital and at nearby Blockley Hospital. He traveled in Europe (1893–1894) and spent time in Boston, where he earned money for later adventures while studying at Harvard. Edward S. Morse, a Harvard zoologist, was giving lectures about Japan, then a subject of great fascination in the West, throughout Boston; Hiller appears to have been inspired by these.

== Expeditions ==
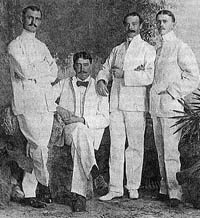
Hiller (left), Furness, and Harrison, with Lewis Etzel, Furness' assistant. Photographed in Singapore, 1898.

Hiller, Furness, and Harrison embarked on a series of expeditions to East and Southeast Asia and Oceania. The three did not always travel together, and the records of their travels are fragmentary in places. Their first two voyages are the best-documented; the last voyage the worst.

In October 1895, Hiller, Furness, and Harrison left the United States, using their own money to search for the fabled Dayak headhunters of Borneo to collect ethnological specimens for the new University of Pennsylvania Museum of Archaeology and Anthropology. On their way to the South Seas, they stopped at Yokohama, Amami, and Okinawa, among other places in Japan, arriving in Borneo after seven months of travel from the United States. They spent four months traveling and collecting in Borneo, although they did not always travel together. After leaving Borneo, they traveled to Singapore, Saigon, and China before returning to Japan, the Republic of Hawaii, and the United States. Hiller arrived in Kahoka on December 4, 1896.

Five months later (May 1897), they were off to Borneo again. Traveling by way of Japan, Shanghai, Hong Kong, and Saigon, they returned to Singapore and used it as a base for a number of expeditions into such places as Kalimantan, Sarawak, British Malaya, and Tambak before returning the way they came. They returned in August or September 1898. While on expedition, Hiller was elected to the American Philosophical Society.

Unlike their other expeditions, the third was an eastward journey. They sailed for England on June 14, 1899, traveling from London to Paris and Marseilles before boarding the Ernest Simon for Asia. The voyage took them through the Suez Canal and to Djibouti before arriving in Colombo, Ceylon. They traveled in Ceylon, India, Burma, and Australia before sailing for Hawaii (recently annexed by the United States) and Vancouver, circling the world before returning home in May 1900.

Their last voyage may have been somewhat restricted by the realities of life (the three were all over 30 by this point). Leaving Philadelphia in February 1901, they traveled to New Orleans and San Francisco before sailing for Honolulu and Yokohama aboard the Sir Coptic. They extensively toured Japan, particularly Hokkaido. Hiller met Jenichiro Oyabe, a Japanese man who had been educated as a missionary at Yale University and Howard University. Oyabe served as a translator and a guide for a side-expedition to the Ainu people, and consequently Hiller amassed a large collection of the objects of Ainu daily life before proceeding to the East Indies. While in the East Indies, he would collect the holotype of the Sumatran slow loris, which was named after him as Nycticebus hilleri. Once Hiller returned home, he stayed in contact with Oyabe, who wrote him friendly letters encouraging him to "tell the world about my beloved Ainu people."

== Later life ==
Hiller married Blanche Hays, of Bellefonte, Pennsylvania. Hiller managed a sugar plantation in Cuba for "a wealthy friend" (Harrison's father was a sugar manufacturer, and Harrison entered his father's business in 1902) from 1902 to about 1907 in order to make money to bankroll his return to Philadelphia and the establishment of a medical practice.

The Hillers settled in Rose Tree, at the north edge of Media, Pennsylvania. Hiller founded a clinic in nearby Chester for poor workers in the factories there. While there, he encountered a devastating outbreak of a disease that spread rapidly and paralyzed its victims, especially children. A few physicians in other towns were experiencing similar outbreaks. They communicated, shared experiences, and realized not only that they were dealing with the same disease ("infantile paralysis"), but that it was a form of polio, which apparently had taken a more damaging, virulent, epidemic form. The Hillers had two daughters.

== Death ==
Hiller died on August 8, 1921, in Bellefonte, Pennsylvania, possibly from complications from polio. He is buried in Union Cemetery in Bellefonte. His widow moved with her daughters to Lower Merion, Pennsylvania, closer to Philadelphia, where she lived until her death in 1944.

== Collections ==
Thanks in significant part to Hiller, the Penn Museum's collection of Ainu artifacts is one of the largest in any museum. The Foundation for Research and Promotion of Ainu Culture (FRPAC) borrowed a sizable portion of the Penn Museum's collection to display in the Ainu Craft Exhibition 2008 at the Niigata Prefectural Museum of History in Nagaoka City, Japan. The Penn Museum also holds 57 artifacts and 3 diaries Furness and Hiller brought back from Amami and Okinawa, and the university library has additional materials.

== Bibliography ==
- Hiram Milliken Hiller, "Wild mountain tribes of Borneo", Harper's, May 1901, pp. 935–944. Accessed 2018.04.24.
- Alison Miner, The Ainu People and an Early Anthropological Friendship Across an Ocean, PennMuseumArchives, February 28, 2009. Accessed 2010.06.20.
- "Furness, Harrison and Hiller expedition records, 1060". University of Pennsylvania Libraries.
- Medical Society of the State of Pennsylvania, The Pennsylvania Medical Journal, Volume 21, pp. 395, 705 (1918).
- Fuji Takayasu, Provenance of Okinawan Artifacts in the United States (日本語), American View, Winter 2008. U.S. Embassy, Tokyo. Accessed 2010.06.19.
- Western Historical Manuscript Collection - Columbia, Hiller Family Papers, 1785-1993 (3856), State Historical Society of Missouri. Accessed 2010.06.19.
