= Anson, Missouri =

Unincorporated community in Missouri, U.S.

Coordinates: 40°34′38″N 91°45′58″W

Anson is an unincorporated community in northern Clark County, in the U.S. state of Missouri.

The community is on Missouri Route 81 approximately two miles south of the Missouri-Iowa border. Kahoka is ten miles south on Route 81. Croton, Iowa is four miles to the east across the Des Moines River. Cedar Creek flows past the north and east sides of the community.

== History ==
A post office called Anson was established in 1872, and remained in operation until 1904. The source of the name Anson is unclear.
