= Elm Branch =

Elm Branch may refer to:

- Elm Branch (East Fork Tebo Creek), a stream in Missouri
- Elm Branch (Salt River), a stream in Missouri
- Elm Branch (Wyaconda River), a stream in Missouri
