= Linn Creek (Fox River tributary) =

Stream in the American state of Missouri

Coordinates: 40.472261°N 91.791834°W

- Linn Branch
- Interactive map of Linn Creek
- Location: Clark County, Missouri
- Type: Creek
- Primary inflows: Todd Branch
- Primary outflows: Fox River

Linn Creek (also known as Linn Branch) is a stream in Clark County in the U.S. state of Missouri. It is a tributary of the Fox River.

Linn Creek was named for the linden timber along its course.

== See also ==
- List of rivers of Missouri
