= Cedar Creek (Des Moines River tributary) =

Stream in the US state of Missouri

Cedar Creek is a stream in Clark County in the U.S. state of Missouri. It is a tributary of the Des Moines River.

The stream headwaters arise northwest of the community of Anson at 40°34′55″N 91°46′40″W. It flows east crossing under Missouri Route 81 north of Anson. It continues to the southeast and east approximately four miles to its confluence with the Des Moines River at 40°33′21″N 91°41′19″W approximately two miles south of Croton, Iowa.

Cedar Creek was named for the red cedar timber along its course.

== See also ==
- List of rivers of Missouri
