= Wyaconda River =

River in Iowa and Missouri, U.S.

- Etymology: Dakota language

Physical characteristics
- Source: Confluence of North Wyaconda River and South Wyaconda river
  - location: State of Missouri
  - coordinates: 40.4046°N 91.8618°W
- 2nd source: North Wyaconda River
  - location: State of Iowa
- 3rd source: South Wyaconda River
  - location: State of Iowa
- Mouth: Mississippi River
  - location: State of Missouri
  - coordinates: 40°03′35″N 91°29′45″W

Basin features
- Tributaries
  - right: Foree Branch

Wyaconda River is a stream in Davis County, in the U.S. state of Iowa, and Lewis and Clark counties in Missouri. It is a tributary of the Mississippi River. It is Missouri's third most northeastern stream, following the Des Moines River and the Fox River.

The source of both the North and South Forks are near Bloomfield, Iowa. The confluence of the two forks is about 35 miles away in west central Clark County, about 3.5 miles east-northeast of Wyaconda at 40°24′17″N 91°51′42″W. The stream flows to the southeast into Lewis County about 1.5 miles southwest of St. Patrick and Missouri Route 81. The stream continues and turns to the south about one mile west of Canton where it passes under Missouri Route 16. The stream turns to the southeast and runs semi-parallel to US Route 61. It passes under Route 61 and meanders to the southeast to enter the Mississippi just north of La Grange. The confluence with the Mississippi is at 40°03′35″N 91°29′45″W at an elevation of 472 feet.

Wyaconda is derived from the Dakota language meaning "sacred power".

West of Canton, the river has a mean annual discharge of 316 cubic feet per second.

== See also ==
- List of rivers of Missouri
- List of rivers of Iowa
