= Medill, Missouri =

Unincorporated community and CDP in western Clark County, Missouri, US

- Census-Designated Place
- Interactive map of Medill, Missouri
- Coordinates: 40°25′48″N 91°46′27″W
- Country: United States
- State: Missouri
- County: Clark

Area
  - Total: 0.78 sq mi (2.03 km^{2})
  - Land: 0.78 sq mi (2.02 km^{2})
  - Water: 0.0039 sq mi (0.01 km^{2})
- Elevation: 709 ft (216 m)

Population (2020)
  - Total: 82
  - Density: 105.3/sq mi (40.67/km^{2})
- ZIP code: 63445
- Area code: 660
- FIPS code: 29-47144
- GNIS feature ID: 2806391

Medill is a census-designated place and unincorporated community in Clark County, in the U.S. state of Missouri. As of the 2020 census, its population was 82.

== Location ==
The community is on US Route 136, three miles west of Kahoka. The Atchison, Topeka and Santa Fe Railroad passes through the community, as did the Chicago, Burlington and Quincy Railroad.

== History ==
Medill was laid out in 1888 when the railroad was extended to that point. A post office was established at Medill in 1889, and remained in operation until 1975.

== Demographics ==
Historical population
Census	Pop.	Note	%±
2020	82		—
U.S. Decennial Census

Medill first appeared as a census designated place in the 2020 U.S. census.

== Transportation ==
Amtrak’s Southwest Chief, which operates between Los Angeles and Chicago, passes through the town on BNSF tracks, but makes no stop. The nearest station is located in Fort Madison, 41 miles (66 km) to the northeast.

== Education ==
It is in the Clark County R-1 School District of Clark County, Missouri. The district's comprehensive high school is Clark County High School.
