= Mantle Branch =

Stream in the American state of Missouri

Coordinates: 40.5436476°N 91.8101679°W

Mantle Branch is a stream in Clark County in the U.S. state of Missouri. It is a tributary of the Fox River.

Mantle Branch has the name of John Mantle, an early settler.

== See also ==
- List of rivers of Missouri
