= Wyaconda, Missouri =

- City
- Location of Wyaconda, Missouri
- Coordinates: 40°23′32″N 91°55′33″W
- Country: United States
- State: Missouri
- County: Clark

Area
  - Total: 0.64 sq mi (1.67 km^{2})
  - Land: 0.64 sq mi (1.66 km^{2})
  - Water: 0 sq mi (0.00 km^{2})
- Elevation: 748 ft (228 m)

Population (2020)
  - Total: 214
  - Density: 332.9/sq mi (128.55/km^{2})
- Time zone: UTC-6 (Central (CST))
  - Summer (DST): UTC-5 (CDT)
- ZIP code: 63474
- Area code: 660
- FIPS code: 29-81142
- GNIS feature ID: 2397383

Wyaconda is a city in Clark County, Missouri, United States. As of the 2020 census, its population was 214. The city was organized in 1888 and is named after a Siouan name for God or the Great Spirit. The first land purchased from the Santa Fe and Land Co. was in 1888.

Wyaconda is part of the Fort Madison–Keokuk, IA-MO Micropolitan Statistical Area.

== Geography ==
Wyaconda is located in western Clark County one mile from the Clark-Scotland county line. The community is at the intersection of Missouri routes A, E and W. Kahoka is approximately eleven miles to the northeast and South Gorin in Scotland County is five miles to the southwest. The Atchison, Topeka and Santa Fe Railroad passes through the community. The South Wyaconda River passes about 1.5 miles to the northeast and the Little Wyaconda River passes about 1.5 miles to the southwest.

According to the United States Census Bureau, the city has a total area of 0.64 square miles (1.66 km^{2}), all land.

== Demographics ==
Historical population
Census	Pop.	Note	%±
1900	507		—
1910	480		−5.3%
1920	659		37.3%
1930	544		−17.5%
1940	517		−5.0%
1950	483		−6.6%
1960	402		−16.8%
1970	356		−11.4%
1980	359		0.8%
1990	347		−3.3%
2000	310		−10.7%
2010	227		−26.8%
2020	214		−5.7%
U.S. Decennial Census

=== 2010 census ===
At the 2010 census, there were 227 people, 108 households and 63 families in the city. The population density was 354.7 inhabitants per square mile (137.0/km^{2}). There were 140 housing units at an average density of 218.8 per square mile (84.5/km^{2}). The racial makeup of the city was 98.2% White and 1.8% from two or more races.

There were 108 households, of which 27.8% had children under the age of 18 living with them, 43.5% were married couples living together, 9.3% had a female householder with no husband present, 5.6% had a male householder with no wife present, and 41.7% were non-families. 38.0% of all households were made up of individuals, and 16.6% had someone living alone who was 65 years of age or older. The average household size was 2.10 and the average family size was 2.76.

The median age was 43.5 years. 24.2% of residents were under the age of 18; 4.7% were between the ages of 18 and 24; 22.1% were from 25 to 44; 30.4% were from 45 to 64; and 18.5% were 65 years of age or older. The population was 49.3% male and 50.7% female.

=== 2000 census ===
At the 2000 census, there were 310 people, 138 households and 84 families residing in the city. The population density was 479.8 inhabitants per square mile (185.3/km^{2}). There were 171 housing units at an average density of 264.7 per square mile (102.2/km^{2}). The population was 99.68% White, and 0.32% from two or more races.

There were 138 households, of which 23.9% had children under the age of 18 living with them, 47.1% were married couples living together, 10.1% had a female householder with no husband present, and 39.1% were non-families. 34.8% of all households were made up of individuals, and 19.6% had someone living alone who was 65 years of age or older. The average household size was 2.25 and the average family size was 2.87.

22.9% of the population were under the age of 18, 9.0% from 18 to 24, 24.5% from 25 to 44, 22.3% from 45 to 64, and 21.3% who were 65 years of age or older. The median age was 41 years. For every 100 females, there were 84.5 males. For every 100 females age 18 and over, there were 83.8 males.

The median household income was $20,893 and the median family income was $25,000. Males had a median income of $24,107 compared with $15,313 for females. The per capita income was $12,913. About 22.5% of families and 24.1% of the population were below the poverty line, including 43.1% of those under age 18 and 19.2% of those age 65 or over.

== Transportation ==
Amtrak’s Southwest Chief, which operates between Los Angeles and Chicago, passes through the town on BNSF tracks, but makes no stop. The nearest station is located in Fort Madison, 54 miles (87 km) to the northeast.

== Education ==
It is in the Clark County R-1 School District. The district's comprehensive high school is Clark County High School.

The Wyaconda C-1 School District ended high school operations in 2002, then closed in 2008.
