= William H. Spurgeon III =

American businessman (1916–1970)

William H. Spurgeon, III
- Born: May 14, 1916; Orange County, California
- Died: September 13, 1970 (aged 54)
- Resting place: Fairhaven Memorial Park
- Spouse: Kathleen "Kay" (nee Higgins)
- Children: Sandra, William IV (Bill), and Shelley

William H. Spurgeon III (May 14, 1916 – September 13, 1970) was a Southern California businessman who worked to promote experientional learning through the Exploring program of the Boy Scouts of America. He was the grandson of William H. Spurgeon. In 1970, he received the Silver Buffalo Award for his contributions to Scouting.

== Background ==
Born in Orange County, California, Spurgeon was the grandson of William H. Spurgeon, the founder of Santa Ana, California, and a former member of the county board of supervisors. During World War II, Spurgeon served as a lieutenant with the Navy in the South Pacific. Following in the family business, Spurgeon went to work for the Irvine Company in the field of real estate development. In 1960, Spurgeon, working with the Irvine Company, partnered with William Pereira to develop the site plan for the proposal to bring the University of Carlifonia, Irvine (UC Irvine) campus to the Irvine Ranch.

In 1939, Spurgeon married Kathleen "Kay" Higgins, with whom he had three children. They remained married until his death in 1970.

Having been a Boy Scout in his youth, Spurgeon's avocation was Scouting. Around 1950, while serving as a board member of the Orange County Council of the Boy Scouts of America, Spurgeon arranged for the Irvine Company to offer part of the Irvine Ranch as the site for the 1953 National Scout Jamboree.

Spurgeon went on to serve on the National Executive Board of the Boy Scouts of America. His passion was the Exploring Program, and he led efforts to promote the co-ed program. In recognition of his outstanding contributions, The William H. Spurgeon III Award was established, becoming the highest recognition for individuals and organizations contributing significant leadership to the Exploring Program.

== Honors and awards ==
- William H. Spurgeon III Award is the highest recognition for individuals and organizations contributing significant leadership to the Exploring program.
- 1958 - Newport Beach Chamber of Commerce - Citizen of the Year Award
