= Iowa Highway 81 =

State highway in Iowa, United States

Iowa Highway 81
- Iowa 81 highlighted in red

Route information
- Maintained by Iowa DOT
- Length: 2.215 mi (3.565 km)
- Existed: January 1, 1969–present

Major junctions
- South end: Route 81 southwest of Farmington
- North end: Iowa 2 in Farmington

Location
- Country: United States
- State: Iowa
- Counties: Van Buren

Highway system
- Iowa Primary Highway System; Interstate; US; State; Secondary; Scenic
← I-80	→ Iowa 83

Iowa Highway 81 is a state highway that runs from south to north in southeastern Iowa. It begins at the Missouri state line southwest of Farmington, where it continues as Missouri Route 81 and ends at Iowa 2 in Farmington. The route Iowa 81 takes has been in the primary highway system since the 1920s. The current Iowa 81 was created on January 1, 1969, when it traded route numbers with Iowa 114 in the southeast-central part of the state.

== Route description ==
Iowa 81 begins at the Missouri border, where it is a continuation of Missouri Route 81. The highway heads in a northeasterly direction from that point, passing by Indian Lake Park along the way. It ends at Iowa 2 on the west side of Farmington.

== History ==
Prior to its current designation, Iowa 81 was known as Iowa 114. On January 1, 1969, Iowa 114 and Iowa 81 traded route numbers in order to harmonize route numbers with neighboring states, Route 81 in Missouri, in this case. At the time of its designation, the highway was a fully paved road.

== Major intersections ==
The entire route is in Van Buren County.

Location	mi	km	Destinations	Notes
Farmington Township	0.000	0.000	Route 81 south – Kahoka	Continuation into Missouri
Farmington	2.215	3.565	Iowa 2 – Farmington, Cantril	
1.000 mi = 1.609 km; 1.000 km = 0.621 mi
