= Chellis =

Chellis is a surname. Notable people with this surname include:

- Con Chellis (born 1978), American politician
- Darryl Chellis (born 1936), Australian politician
- John Chellis Conner (1913–2001), American marimbist
- John F. Chellis (1792–1883), American politician

== See also ==
- Chellis Glendinning, American author and social-change activist
