= Wade Branch =

Stream in the American state of Missouri

Coordinates: 40°27′52″N 91°43′24″W

Wade Branch is a stream in Clark County in the U.S. state of Missouri. It is a tributary of the Fox River.

Wade Branch has the name of the local Wade family.

== See also ==
- List of rivers of Missouri
