= Revere School District =

Revere School District may refer to:

- Revere Local School District (Ohio)
- Revere Public Schools (Massachusetts)
- Revere C-3 School District (Missouri)
