= Battle of Athens State Historic Site =

Historic battlefield in the U.S. state of Missouri

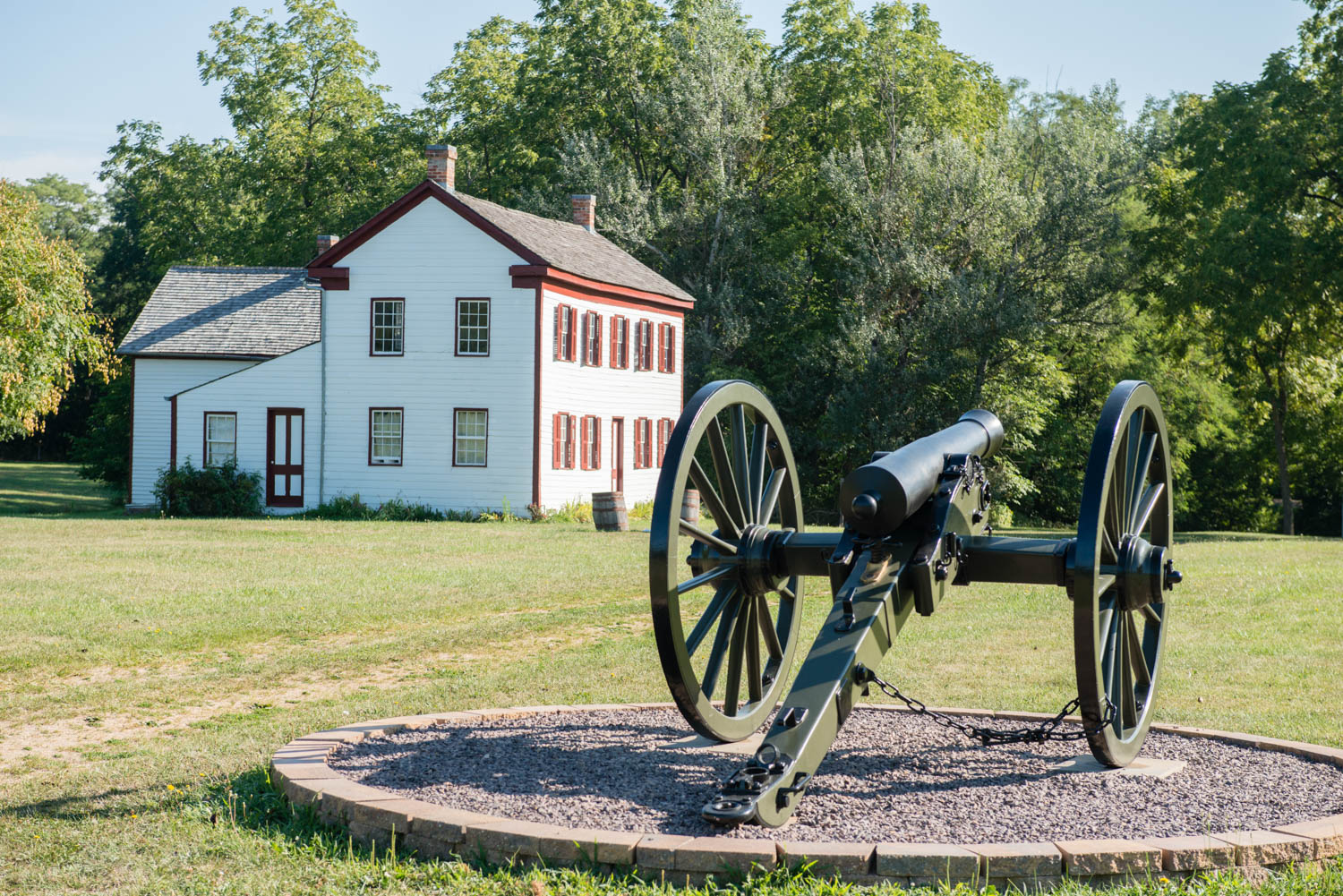

- Location within Missouri Location within the United States
- Location: Sweet Home Twp, Clark County, Missouri, United States
- Coordinates: 40°35′16″N 91°42′14″W
- Area: 408.5 acres (165.3 ha)
- Established: 1975
- Visitors: 58,262 (in 2023)
- Administrator: Missouri Department of Natural Resources
- Website: Official website

Battle of Athens State Historic Site is a historic battlefield and state park in Clark County, Missouri, along the banks of the Des Moines River. It is the site of the Battle of Athens, fought in 1861 during the American Civil War. The site serves as an open-air museum interpreting the battle and its aftermath. It is one of the northernmost places in the state.

== History ==
The once-thriving river village of Athens, Missouri, had up to fifty businesses and a large mill in antebellum times. In July 1861, it was occupied by pro-Union forces of the Missouri Home Guard. Wanting to seize the strategically important village for the Confederacy, elements of the pro-Southern Missouri State Guard attacked on August 5, 1861. Despite being outnumbered more than three-to-one, the Home Guard emerged victorious. A small action when compared to other battles, with casualties light, it nonetheless holds the distinction of being the northernmost Civil War battle fought west of the Mississippi River.

Following the battle, many bitter feelings remained among residents. This along with the coming of railroads and less reliance on river shipping sealed the fate of Athens. By the turn of the 20th century Athens was a veritable ghost town. In 1962, remaining area residents worked together to create the Battle of Athens Park, which was donated to the state of Missouri in 1975.

== Activities and amenities ==
In addition to interpretive programs and free tours of the Thome-Benning House, the site offers facilities for camping and fishing plus three picnicking areas and two hiking trails.
