= Des Moines Township, Clark County, Missouri =

Township in the US state of Missouri

Coordinates: 40.4218216°N 91.5622193°W

Des Moines Township is an inactive township in Clark County, in the U.S. state of Missouri.

Des Moines Township was named after the Des Moines River.
