= Montgomery Opera House =

- U.S. National Register of Historic Places
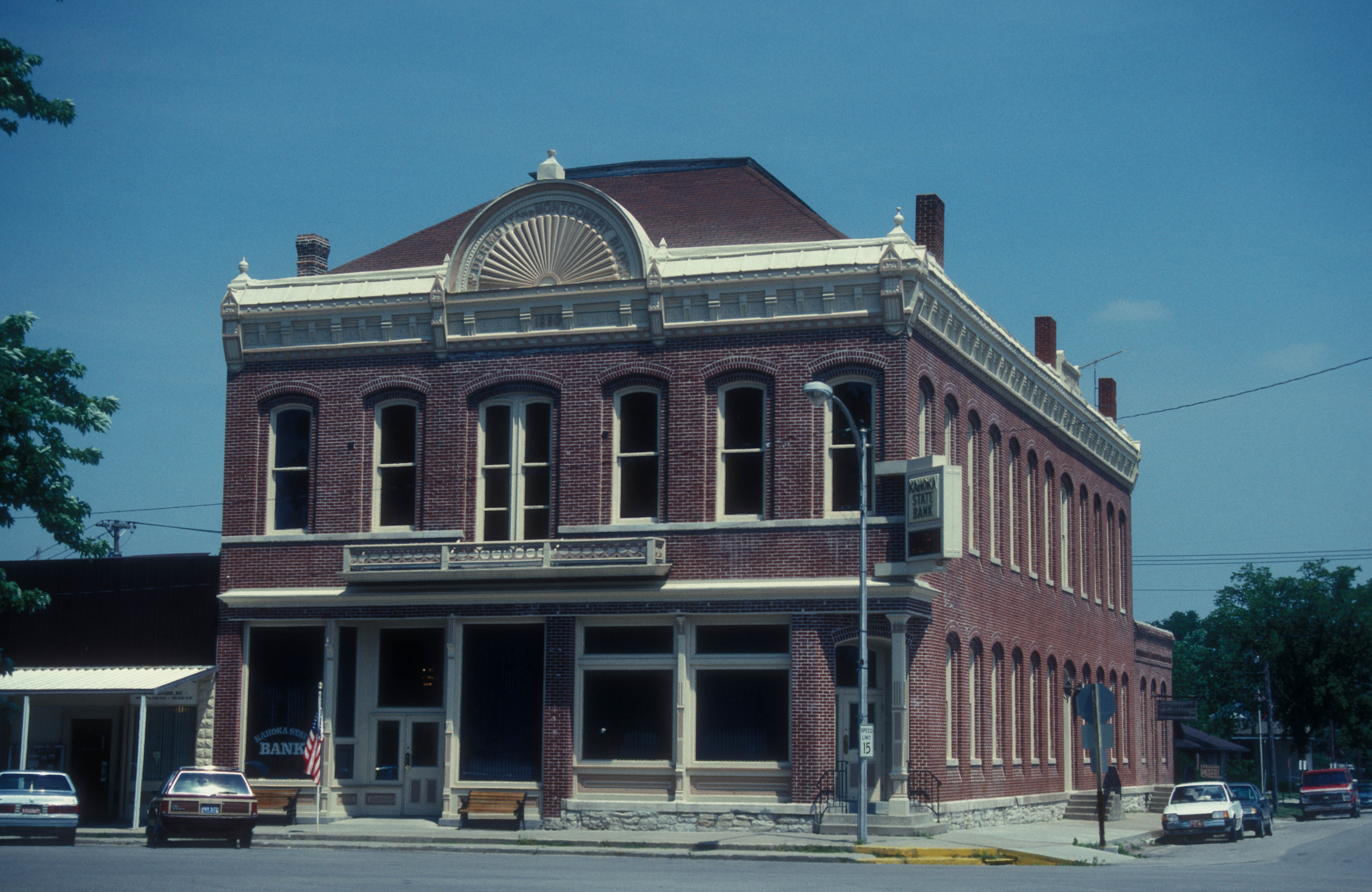
- Montgomery Opera House, January 2007

- Location within Missouri Location within the United States
- Location: 201-209 W. Commercial St., Kahoka, Missouri
- Coordinates: 40°24′44″N 91°43′20″W
- Area: less than one acre
- Built: 1890
- Architectural style: Late Victorian
- NRHP reference No.: 88002018
- Added to NRHP: October 20, 1988

Montgomery Opera House, also known as Clark County Savings Bank and Kahoka State Bank, is a historic opera house located at Kahoka, Clark County, Missouri. It was built in 1890, and is a two-story, Late Victorian style brick building. The building features a high hipped roof, elaborate pressed metal cornice, and finely detailed brick work.

It was listed on the National Register of Historic Places in 1988.
