= Clark County R-1 School District =

School district in Missouri, U.S.

Clark County R-1 School District is a school district of Clark County, Missouri, headquartered in Kahoka, Missouri.

The district, mostly in Clark County, includes the municipalities of Kahoka, Alexandria, Luray, Revere, Wayland, and Wyaconda, as well as the Medill and St. Francisville census-designated places. The district extends into Lewis County.

== History ==
In 2002, the Revere C-3 School District ended its high school and began sending its students to Clark County High School. As of April 2012, there were some people in the Revere C-3 district using addresses from children's grandparents to send them to the K-8 program in the Clark County R-I district, even though Missouri law did not allow for school districts to enroll students from other districts without formal agreements. The Revere C-3 district merged into the Clark County School District in summer 2012.

In 2002, the Wyaconda C-1 School District ended its high school and began sending some of its students to Clark County High. That district dissolved in 2008, and most of its students went to the Clark County school district.

Ritchie Kracht began his term as superintendent circa 2006. In 2025 he was to take the superintendent post at Hannibal Public Schools.

In 2024 there was a school board meeting about the possibility of closing Running Fox Elementary School.

Lyndel Whittle became the superintendent effective July 1, 2025.

== Schools ==
- Clark County High School
- Clark County Middle School
- Black Hawk Elementary School
- Running Fox Elementary School
  - It is in proximity to Alexandria. It is near a four-lane highway. Superintendent Ritchie Kracht stated that the school "is out there in the middle of the country" and far from emergency services.
- Early Childhood Center
