= Peaksville, Missouri =

Unincorporated community in Missouri, U.S.

Coordinates: 40°30′25″N 91°41′50″W

Peaksville is an unincorporated community in Clark County, in the U.S. state of Missouri.

== History ==
Peaksville was platted in 1852 by Mary E. Peake, and named after Dr. Peake, a pioneer citizen. There was a post office in Peaksville from 1858 to 1904. When the railroad was built to the East of Peaksville homes were raised and moved to the newly established village of Revere. In 1910 there were two churches in Peaksville, the Christian Church and the Winebrennerian Church (modern day Church of God); there was also a doctor and two general stores. The Winebrennerian Church was closed around 1910. The Peaksville School was located 1/4 mile northwest of the village, just east of the Peaksville Cemetery. It was consolidated into the Revere School District in 1923 and then physically moved to Revere and used for a classroom until the Revere School was constructed in 1925. All businesses except a general store were gone before 1940 and today only the Peaksville Christian Church remains (2025). The church is a very active congregation and expanded in 2016. In 2025 there were 8 residents in the village. A post office called Peakesville was established in 1858, and remained in operation until 1905.
