= Todd Branch =

Stream in the American state of Missouri

Coordinates: 40°28′15″N 91°48′13″W

Todd Branch is a stream in Clark County in the U.S. state of Missouri.

Todd Branch has the last name of a local country doctor.

== See also ==
- List of rivers of Missouri
