= St. Francisville, Missouri =

Unincorporated community in Missouri, U.S.

- Census-Designated Place
- Interactive map of St. Francisville, Missouri
- Coordinates: 40°26′59″N 91°34′19″W
- Country: United States
- State: Missouri
- County: Clark

Area
  - Total: 1.91 sq mi (4.95 km^{2})
  - Land: 1.86 sq mi (4.81 km^{2})
  - Water: 0.054 sq mi (0.14 km^{2})
- Elevation: 633 ft (193 m)

Population (2020)
  - Total: 137
  - Density: 73.7/sq mi (28.46/km^{2})
- ZIP code: 63472
- Area code: 660
- FIPS code: 29-64244
- GNIS feature ID: 2587112

St. Francisville or Saint Francisville is an unincorporated community and census-designated place in northeast Clark County, Missouri, United States. As of the 2020 census, its population was 137.

The community is on Missouri Route B four miles north of Wayland. The Des Moines River and the Missouri-Iowa border are one-half mile north of the community. It is the oldest settlement in Clark County, Missouri.

== Etymology ==
St. Francisville was platted in 1833, by a man named Francis Church.

== Demographics ==
Historical population
Census	Pop.	Note	%±
2020	137		—
U.S. Decennial Census

== Education ==
It is in the Clark County R-1 School District. The district's comprehensive high school is Clark County High School.
