= Foree Branch =

Stream in the American state of Missouri

Coordinates: 40.3550408°N 91.7879447°W

Foree Branch is a stream in Clark County in the U.S. state of Missouri.

Foree is a corruption of the surname Faure, after a local family of settlers.

== See also ==
- List of rivers of Missouri
