= Fairmont, Missouri =

Unincorporated community in Missouri, U.S.

Coordinates: 40°19′53″N 91°54′36″W

Fairmont is an unincorporated community in Clark County, in the U.S. state of Missouri.

== History ==
Fairmont was laid out in 1851, and named for its lofty elevation. A post office called Fairmont was established in 1851, and remained in operation until 1907.

== Notable ==
Fairmont is home to a local fur trading and tanning post.

Beneath a tree rests the leg of Henry Tague, who lost this limb from diabetes and decided to have it given a full ceremonial treatment.
