= Gregory Landing, Missouri =

Unincorporated community in Missouri, U.S.

Coordinates: 40°16′53″N 91°29′47″W

Gregory Landing is an unincorporated community in Clark County, in the U.S. state of Missouri.

== History ==
Gregory Landing had its start in the 1830s as a shipping point on the Mississippi River. A post office called Gregory's Landing was established in 1868, and remained in operation until 1954.
