= Chambersburg, Missouri =

Unincorporated community in Missouri, U.S.

Coordinates: 40°31′26″N 91°47′58″W

Chambersburg is an unincorporated community in Clark County, in the U.S. state of Missouri.

== History ==
A post office called Chambersburg was established in 1849, and remained in operation until 1904. The community was most likely named after Chambersburg, Pennsylvania, the hometown of some of the first settlers.
