= Acasto, Missouri =

Unincorporated community in Missouri

Coordinates: 40°35′53″N 91°50′03″W

Location of Acasto within the state of Missouri.

Acasto is an unincorporated community in Clark County, in the U.S. state of Missouri.

== History ==
A post office called Acasto was established in 1857, and remained in operation until 1905. The community has the name of the local Acasto family.
