= Sweet Home Township, Clark County, Missouri =

Township in Clark County, Missouri, U.S.

Coordinates: 40.50°N 91.64°W

Sweet Home Township is an inactive township in Clark County, in the U.S. state of Missouri.

Sweet Home Township took its name from the now extinct town of Sweet Home, which was founded in the early 1830s.
