= Union Township, Clark County, Missouri =

Inactive township in the American state of Missouri

Coordinates: 40.35°N 91.76°W

Union Township is an inactive township in Clark County, in the U.S. state of Missouri.

Union Township was established in 1868, taking its name from Union, Clark County, Missouri.
