= Elm Branch (Wyaconda River tributary) =

Stream in the US state of Missouri

Coordinates: 40°28′52″N 91°56′11″W

Elm Branch is a stream in Clark and Scotland counties in the U.S. state of Missouri. It is a tributary of the Wyaconda River.

Elm Branch was named for the elm timber along its course.

== See also ==
- List of rivers of Missouri
