= Washington Township, Clark County, Missouri =

Township in Clark County, Missouri, U.S.

Coordinates: 40.35°N 91.87°W

Washington Township is an inactive township in Clark County, in the U.S. state of Missouri.

Washington Township has the name of President George Washington.
