= Vernon Township, Clark County, Missouri =

Township in Clark County, Missouri, United States

Coordinates: 40.36°N 91.45°W

Vernon Township is an inactive township in Clark County, in the U.S. state of Missouri.

Vernon Township was established in 1868, taking its name Mount Vernon, the Virginia estate of George Washington.
