= Luray, Missouri =

- Village
- Location of Luray, Missouri
- Coordinates: 40°27′08″N 91°53′03″W
- Country: United States
- State: Missouri
- County: Clark

Area
  - Total: 0.20 sq mi (0.52 km^{2})
  - Land: 0.20 sq mi (0.52 km^{2})
  - Water: 0 sq mi (0.00 km^{2})
- Elevation: 725 ft (221 m)

Population (2020)
  - Total: 73
  - Density: 361.8/sq mi (139.69/km^{2})
- Time zone: UTC-6 (Central (CST))
  - Summer (DST): UTC-5 (CDT)
- ZIP code: 63453
- Area code: 660
- FIPS code: 29-44516
- GNIS feature ID: 2399202

Luray is a village in Clark County, Missouri, United States. As of the 2020 census, its population was 73. It is part of the Fort Madison–Keokuk, IA-MO Micropolitan Statistical Area.

== History ==
Luray was platted in 1837. The source of the name Luray is obscure; according to the State Historical Society of Missouri, most likely it is Native American in origin. A post office called Luray has been in operation since 1841. After 170 years in operation, the Luray office closed on November 4, 2011.

== Geography ==
Luray is located on US Route 136, 6.5 miles west of Kahoka. The Clark-Scotland county line is approximately three miles west of the community. The North Wyaconda River flows past about three quarters of a mile to the southwest.

According to the United States Census Bureau, the village has a total area of 0.20 square miles (0.52 km^{2}), all land.

== Demographics ==
Historical population
Census	Pop.	Note	%±
1880	217		—
1890	246		13.4%
1900	194		−21.1%
1910	163		−16.0%
1920	164		0.6%
1930	197		20.1%
1940	202		2.5%
1950	184		−8.9%
1960	154		−16.3%
1970	149		−3.2%
1980	175		17.4%
1990	70		−60.0%
2000	102		45.7%
2010	99		−2.9%
2020	73		−26.3%
U.S. Decennial Census

=== 2010 census ===
As of the census of 2010, there were 99 people, 37 households, and 22 families residing in the village. The population density was 495.0 inhabitants per square mile (191.1/km^{2}). There were 39 housing units at an average density of 195.0 per square mile (75.3/km^{2}). The racial makeup of the village was 99.0% White and 1.0% African American.

There were 37 households, of which 37.8% had children under the age of 18 living with them, 54.1% were married couples living together, 5.4% had a male householder with no wife present, and 40.5% were non-families. 35.1% of all households were made up of individuals, and 10.8% had someone living alone who was 65 years of age or older. The average household size was 2.68 and the average family size was 3.27.

The median age in the village was 35.1 years. 33.3% of residents were under the age of 18; 5.1% were between the ages of 18 and 24; 32.4% were from 25 to 44; 20.4% were from 45 to 64; and 9.1% were 65 years of age or older. The gender makeup of the village was 54.5% male and 45.5% female.

=== 2000 census ===
As of the census of 2000, there were 102 people, 39 households, and 26 families residing in the village. The population density was 519.7 inhabitants per square mile (200.7/km^{2}). There were 46 housing units at an average density of 234.4 per square mile (90.5/km^{2}). The racial makeup of the village was 99.02% White and 0.98% African American.

There were 39 households, out of which 30.8% had children under the age of 18 living with them, 51.3% were married couples living together, 12.8% had a female householder with no husband present, and 30.8% were non-families. 25.6% of all households were made up of individuals, and 7.7% had someone living alone who was 65 years of age or older. The average household size was 2.62, and the average family size was 3.07.

In the village, the population was spread out, with 31.4% under the age of 18, 4.9% from 18 to 24, 32.4% from 25 to 44, 21.6% from 45 to 64, and 9.8% who were 65 years of age or older. The median age was 34 years. For every 100 females, there were 108.2 males. For every 100 females age 18 and over, there were 100.0 males.

The median income for a household in the village was $23,125, and the median income for a family was $23,750. Males had a median income of $21,250 versus $26,250 for females. The per capita income for the village was $10,927. There were 20.0% of families and 27.7% of the population living below the poverty line, including 30.3% of under eighteens and 100.0% of those over 64.

== Education ==
It is in the Clark County R-1 School District. The district's comprehensive high school is Clark County High School.
