= Madison Township, Clark County, Missouri =

Township in Clark County, Missouri, U.S.

Coordinates: 40.4259°N 91.6536°W

Madison Township is an inactive township in Clark County, in the U.S. state of Missouri.

Madison Township has the name of President James Madison.
