= Sickles Tavern =

Historic tavern in Missouri, United States

- U.S. National Register of Historic Places
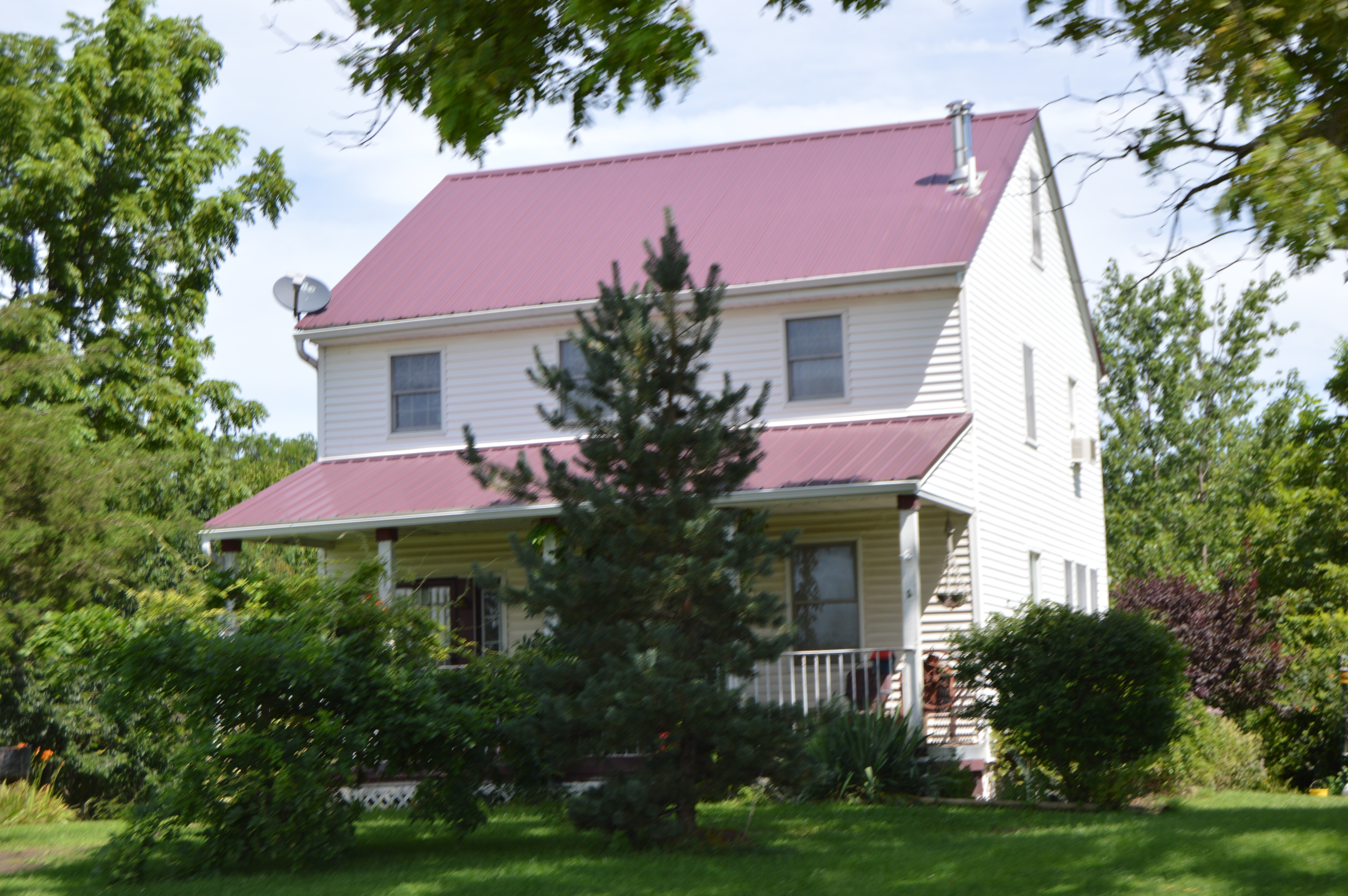
- Sickles Tavern, July 2015

- Location within Missouri Location within the United States
- Location: Northwest of Wayland on Route B, Wayland, Missouri
- Coordinates: 40°26′26″N 91°36′13″W
- Area: 2 acres (0.81 ha)
- Built: c. 1846
- NRHP reference No.: 79001357
- Added to NRHP: October 22, 1979

Sickles Tavern, also known as Hickory Inn, is a historic inn and tavern located near Wayland, Clark County, Missouri. It was built about 1846, and is a two-story, rectangular, vernacular frame dwelling with full basement and attic. It is an example of a "two-thirds house" - a two-story structure one room wide and two rooms deep, with an end hallway. During the 19th century, it is believed that the house was a tavern and stopping place for the mail and passenger coaches passing from Iowa into Kansas and beyond.

It was listed on the National Register of Historic Places in 1979.
