= Athens, Missouri =

Former community in Missouri, United States

Coordinates: 40°34′57″N 91°41′55″W

Athens is an unincorporated community in the now inactive township of Grant in Clark County, Missouri, United States. It is southeast of the Battle of Athens State Historic Site.

== History ==
Athens was laid out and platted in 1844. The community was named for Athens, Greece. A post office called Athens was established in 1841, and remained in operation until 1922.
