= Clark County Courthouse (Missouri) =

- U.S. National Register of Historic Places
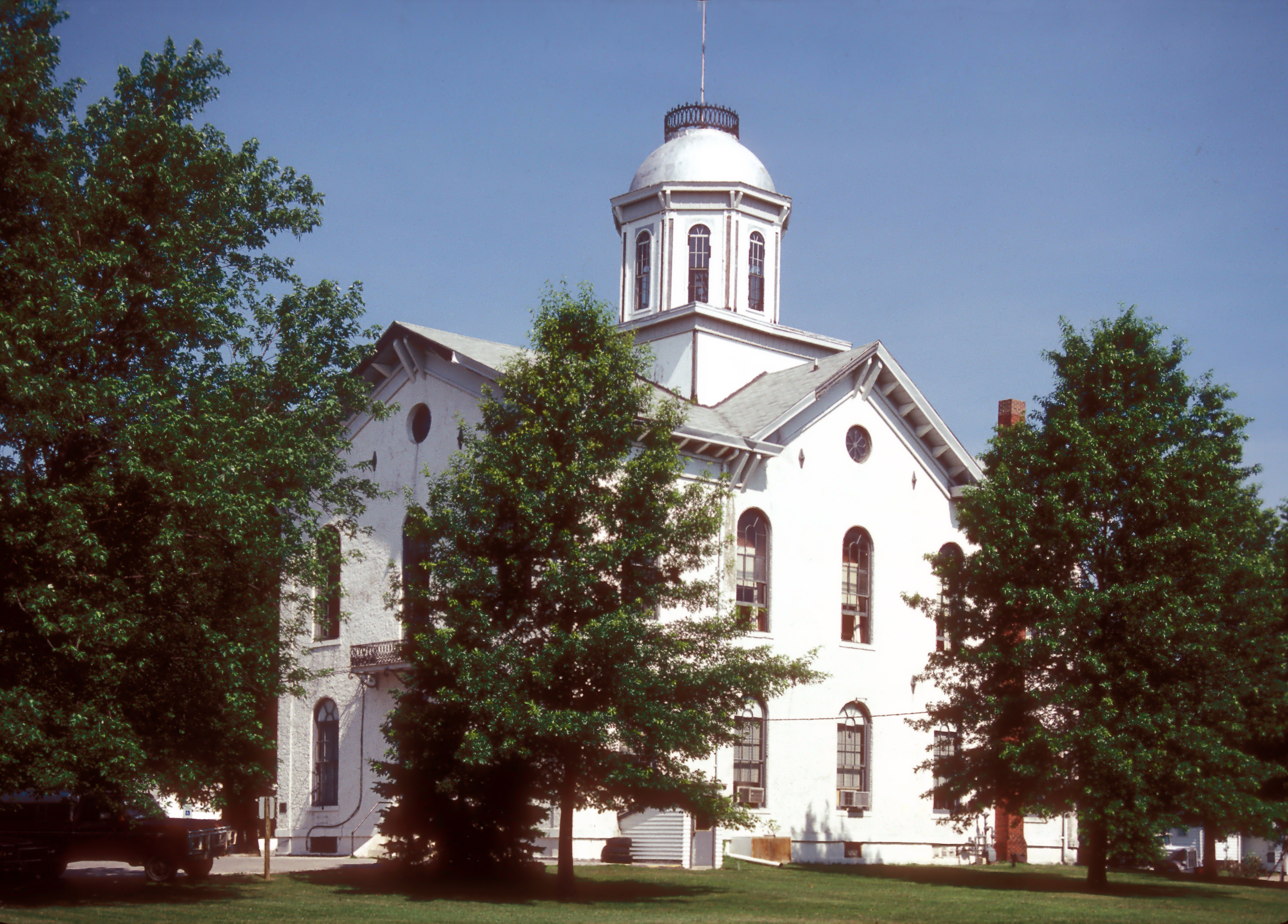
- Clark County Courthouse, January 2007

- Location within Missouri Location within the United States
- Location: 101 E. Court Street, Kahoka, Missouri
- Coordinates: 40°25′30″N 91°43′48″W
- Area: less than one acre
- Built: 1871
- Architect: W. B. Lakeworthy
- NRHP reference No.: 83000976
- Added to NRHP: September 8, 1983

Clark County Courthouse was a historic courthouse located at Kahoka, Clark County, Missouri. It was built in 1871, and was a two-story, cross-plan, brick building sheathed in stucco. The building featured quoins, bracketed eaves, and an octagonal cupola. It was demolished following a 2010 vote.

It was listed on the National Register of Historic Places in 1983.
