= Neeper, Missouri =

Unincorporated community in Missouri, U.S.

Coordinates: 40°19′57″N 91°47′30″W

Neeper is an unincorporated community in Clark County, in the U.S. state of Missouri.

== History ==
A post office called Neeper was established in 1875, and remained in operation until 1904. The community has the name of Dr. Samuel Neeper, an early settler.
