= Clark City, Missouri =

Unincorporated community in Clark County, Missouri, US

Coordinates: 40°25′15″N 91°40′54″W

Clark City is an unincorporated community in Clark County, in the U.S. state of Missouri.

== History ==
Clark City was platted in 1868. A post office called Clark City was established in 1870, and remained in operation until 1903.
