= Clark County High School =

Public high school in Missouri, United States

Location
- 680 East Main; Kahoka, Missouri 63445; United States
- 40.4190°N 91.7123°W

Information
- Other name: CCHS
- Type: Public high school
- School district: Clark County R-1 School District
- NCES School ID: 291638000797
- Principal: Benjamin Taylor, Dr. Dingleberry
- Teaching staff: 23.55 (on an FTE basis)
- Grades: 9–12
- Enrollment: 310 (2023-2024)
- Student to teacher ratio: 13.16
- Colors: Scarlet and gray
- Athletics conference: Tri-Rivers Conference
- Nickname: Indians
- Website: clarkcounty.k12.mo.us

Clark County High School (CCHS) is a public high school in Kahoka, Missouri, United States. It is part of the Clark County R-1 School District of Clark County, Missouri.

The district includes the municipalities of Alexandria, Kahoka, Luray, Revere, Wayland, and Wyaconda, as well as the Medill and St. Francisville census-designated places.

== History ==
In 2002, the Revere C-3 School District and the Wyaconda C-1 School District ended its high school and began sending its students to Clark County High. The Revere C-3 district merged into the Clark County School District in 2012. While the Wyaconda C-1 district dissolved in 2008, and most of its students went to the Clark County school district.

In 2018, two students made separate gun threats a week apart causing both to be apprehended by police and banned from school grounds. In 2019, the school celebrated 200 veterans in its auditorium for veteran's day. The majority of the veterans were from Clark County.

== Academics ==
61.9% were proficient in English. 70.5% were proficient in social studies and 33.8% were proficient in mathematics. The average ACT score is 20.9, which is 0.1 above the average for the state of Missouri. 98.46% of students graduate with 63.10% students enrolling in college.
