= Newport Beach Chamber of Commerce =

- Founded: 1906
- Purpose: Business advocacy & federation
- Location: Newport Beach, California
- Key people: Steve Rosasnky, President & CEO; Jeff Parker, Chief Operating Officer
- Website: NewportBeach.com

The Newport Beach Chamber of Commerce is a Newport Beach, California-based business organization of almost 1,000 members representing over 25,000 employees. The Chamber consists of five councils, committees, staff and members, and works with city officials, local businesses and the community to promote the local economy.

== History ==
On March 12, 1907, sixteen men calling themselves the "Harbor Boosters" established the Newport Beach Chamber of Commerce. Each man contributed five dollars to cover the initial expenses of the first commercial body formed in the city.

Within its first year of creation, the Newport Beach Chamber of Commerce launched free rides for Orange County residents over the entirety of Newport Bay (California).

When the final reclamation of the bay was complete thirty years later in 1936 nearly all of the Charter members were gone, but many of them devoted their lives to the creation of Newport Harbor. Through its life, the Newport Beach Chamber of Commerce played an active part in improving the city, through harbor, industrial and municipal matters, but also by initiating and sponsoring various celebrations and civic events.

For a period of eight years, from 1919 to 1927, there existed two chambers, Balboa Island and Newport Beach. In 1927, the chambers merged into the Newport Harbor Chamber of Commerce. The city was divided into six districts, each of which was entitled to two directors on the board of twelve. These sections were: 1) Newport Heights and West Newport, 2) Newport Beach, 3) East Newport, 4) Balboa, 5) Balboa Island, and 6) Corona del Mar.

In 1976, the word "area" was added to the name to better reflect the character of the surrounding communities, which compose the membership. In the same year, the Newport Harbor Area Chamber of Commerce reached a significant milestone when it moved into the new headquarters building of 10,000 square feet (930 m^{2}) at its present location at 1470 Jamboree Road.

In 2001 the Chamber’s official name was changed to the Newport Beach Chamber of Commerce to better associate with the Newport Beach name. As of February 2017, the Newport Beach Chamber, which started on March 12, 1907 with only 16 Charter members has grown to nearly 1,000 members, representing a cross-section of the harbor area, and is one of the largest regional Chambers in Orange County. The Chamber is funded 100% by member dues and special event income.

In 2007, the Newport Beach Chamber of Commerce celebrated 100th year in the city.

The city of Newport Beach, California works closes with the Chamber of Commerce in "designing and implementing programs to enhance the economic vitality of the community."

== See also ==
- Newport Beach
- US Chamber of Commerce
- Los Angeles Chamber of Commerce
- Manhattan Chamber of Commerce
