= Burnt Shirt Branch =

Stream in the American state of Missouri

Coordinates: 40.57433°N 91.87426°W

Burnt Shirt Branch is a stream in the U.S. state of Missouri.

Some say the area was named "Burnt Shirt" because an old shirt was used to fuel a light, while others believe a railroad man's shirt was burned in an accident.

== See also ==
- List of rivers of Missouri
