= Wyaconda C-1 School District =

School district in Missouri, United States

Wyaconda C-1 School District was a school district based in Wyaconda, Missouri.

It was initially a K-12 school district. It ended high school operations in 2002 and began to send high school-aged students to the Clark County R-1 School District's Clark County High School and the Scotland County R-I School District high school. In May 2006 the state revoked its accreditation, stating that it habitually was not academically performing. In 2008, in the district's sole K-8 school, it had 32 students. 13 students living in the district boundaries attended other school districts.

In April 2008 the Missouri State Board of Education voted to eliminate the school district. This was the first such time that the state board closed a school district due to low academic achievement. The bulk of the students were to move on to the Clark County school district.
