= Antioch, Missouri =

Unincorporated community in Missouri, U.S.

Coordinates: 40°19′29″N 91°41′36″W

Antioch is an unincorporated community in Clark County, in the U.S. state of Missouri.

== History ==
A post office called Antioch was established in 1883, and remained in operation until 1907. The community took its name from a nearby Methodist church of the same name.

In 1925, Antioch had 45 inhabitants.
