= John Chellis Conner =

American musician

- Born: October 3, 1913; Kahoka, Missouri
- Died: August 20, 2001 (aged 87)
- Occupation: marimbist

John Chellis "Jack" Conner (October 3, 1913 – August 20, 2001) was an American marimbist.

Conner was born in Kahoka, Missouri in 1913. At the age of six, he began his studies of piano and percussion instruments. By the age of twelve, he was playing regularly on the radio with the KMOX Junior Orchestra. As a young artist he was a member of the International Marimba Symphony Orchestra during their European tour in 1935. Before pursuing a solo career, he was a member of both the St. Louis Symphony Orchestra and the St. Louis Municipal Opera Orchestra and was regularly heard on major St. Louis radio stations.

He served overseas with the USO in the European theater and he later toured South America with the Xavier Cugat Orchestra. As one of the first percussionists to take the marimba and vibraphone into the classical world as solo instruments, he made his New York debut at Town Hall in 1950. After hearing Conner’s artistry on the instruments, Darius Milhaud, the French composer, was inspired to compose a concerto for Conner to perform. This Concerto for Marimba and Vibraphone was given its world premier with the St. Louis Symphony Orchestra in 1948 with Vladimir Golschmann conducting.

In addition to his classical career, Conner was a jazz musician, especially in the New York City area. He was associated with Roger Williams, the pianist, with whom he had a 25-year association. He also performed with the Don Ho show in Hawaii and Las Vegas and served as music director and conductor for Anita Bryant. He also appeared on numerous radio and television programs such as Merv Griffin, Mike Douglas and the Lawrence Welk Show.

Conner’s greatest love was inspirational and sacred music and he had a longtime association with Youth for Christ and World Vision, and his ministry in Christian music took him into concert halls, theaters, and churches throughout the world. He was also a producer of Christian films such as “In God We Trust”, which he wrote and in which he played a major role. He made numerous recordings featuring both the marimba and vibraphone.

In 1990, he was presented the honorary degree, Doctor of Sacred Music, by Trinity College of Florida. He spent his later years performing with his son and daughter-in-law as “The Conners in Concert.”
