= Elm Branch (East Fork Tebo Creek tributary) =

Stream in the US state of Missouri

Coordinates: 38.50052°N 93.52962°W

Elm Branch is a stream in Pettis and Henry counties in the U.S. state of Missouri. It is a tributary of East Fork Tebo Creek.

Elm Branch was so named on account of elm timber in the area.

== See also ==
- List of rivers of Missouri
- Tebo Creek
