= Union, Clark County, Missouri =

Unincorporated community in Missouri, U.S.

Coordinates: 40°21′46″N 91°45′16″W

Union is an unincorporated community in Clark County, in the U.S. state of Missouri.

Union was laid out in 1855.
