= Missouri Route 16 =

State highway in Missouri, U.S.

Route 16
- Route 16 highlighted in red

Route information
- Maintained by MoDOT
- Length: 16.709 mi (26.891 km)
- Existed: 1931–present
- History: Formerly Route 96

Major junctions
- West end: Route 6 near Lewistown
- US 61 in Canton
- East end: US 61 Bus. / Route B in Canton

Location
- Country: United States
- State: Missouri

Highway system
- Missouri State Highway System; Interstate; US; State; Supplemental
← Route 15	→ Route 17

Route 16 is a 16.709-mile-long (26.891 km) highway in Lewis County, Missouri. The western terminus is at Route 6 east of Lewistown. The route travels eastward, through Monticello and over a few rivers. Route 16 then intersects U.S. Route 61 (US 61). The route ends at US 61 Business and Route B in Canton. The road was formerly part of Route 6, but it was rerouted in 1931. The old alignment was renumbered Route 96 that year. Ten years later, the route was renumbered to Route 16.

== Route description ==
All of Route 16 is in Lewis County. Route 16 starts at a three-way junction at Route 6 in rural farmland east of Lewistown. The route travels eastward in a straight line for over two miles (3.2 km) before turning northeast. It crosses over the Middle Fabius River one mile (1.6 km) later. Route 16 then passes through large groups of forests and enters back into large fields. The road continues traveling northeast and intersects Routes Y and BB. From there, Route 16 heads northward, crossing over North Fabius River, and enters Monticello. The road passes through the center of the village and meets Route A as it turns east. The route then intersects Route Z, near the Lewis County Regional Airport. The road begins to shift northward, and three miles (4.8 km) later, Route 16 crosses over Sugar Creek. At Wyanconda River, the route begins to shift back southward, and enters the city limits of Canton. The route intersects Route 81, and later intersects US 61 at a diamond interchange. The road enters downtown Canton, and ends at a junction with Route B and US 61 Business. The river crossing lies east of the terminus. In 2012, Missouri Department of Transportation (MoDOT) calculated as many as 1,160 vehicles traveling east of Route 6, and as few as 1,054 vehicles traveling east of Route A. This is expressed in terms of annual average daily traffic (AADT), a measure of traffic volume for any average day of the year.

== History ==
A road from Lewistown to Canton has existed since 1918, and it became part of Route 6 by 1926. A section of a road from Monticello to Lewiston was paved in gravel two years later. In 1931, Route 6 was re-aligned south of Canton, and the former alignment was designated as Route 96. The next year, Route 96 was fully paved in gravel. The route was renumbered to Route 16 in 1941, and was fully paved in concrete by 1942. In 1977, US 61 was realigned west of Canton, and the old route became Route B. Around 1989–1990, US 61 Business was designated, concurrent with Route B through Canton. An interchange was built at US 61 and Route 16 around 2001–2002.

== Major intersections ==
The entire route is in Lewis County.

Location	mi	km	Destinations	Notes
	0.000	0.000	Route 6	Western terminus
	4.132	6.650	Route Y	Southern terminus of Route Y
	4.807	7.736	Route BB	Northern terminus of Route BB
Monticello	6.166	9.923	Route A	Southern terminus of Route A
	8.270	13.309	Route Z	Northern terminus of Route Z
	12.495	20.109	Route F	Southern terminus of Route F
Canton	15.449	24.863	Route 81	Southern terminus of Route 81
Canton	15.508– 15.632	24.958– 25.157	US 61 (Avenue of the Saints)	Diamond interchange
Canton	16.709	26.891	US 61 Bus. / Route B / Great River Road	Eastern terminus
1.000 mi = 1.609 km; 1.000 km = 0.621 mi
