= Alexandria, Missouri =

City in Clark County, Missiouri, United States

- City
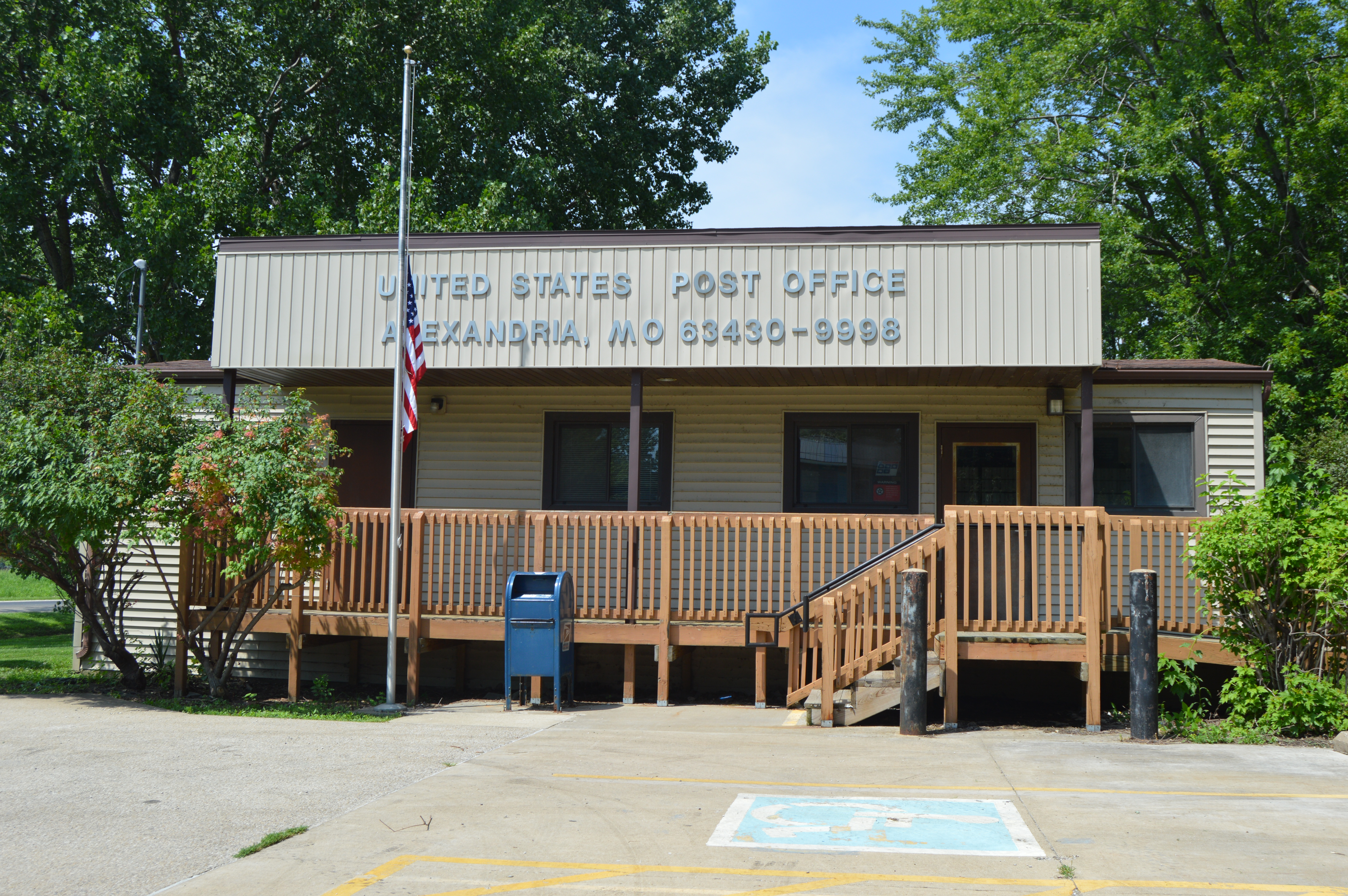

- Location of Alexandria, Missouri
- Coordinates: 40°21′35″N 91°27′34″W
- Country: United States
- State: Missouri
- County: Clark
- Incorporated: 1948

Area
  - Total: 0.39 sq mi (1.01 km^{2})
  - Land: 0.38 sq mi (0.98 km^{2})
  - Water: 0.015 sq mi (0.04 km^{2})
- Elevation: 489 ft (149 m)

Population (2020)
  - Total: 105
  - Density: 278.8/sq mi (107.63/km^{2})
- Time zone: UTC-6 (Central (CST))
  - Summer (DST): UTC-5 (CDT)
- ZIP code: 63430
- Area code: 660
- FIPS code: 29-00604
- GNIS feature ID: 2393919

Alexandria is a city in eastern Clark County, Missouri, United States. As of the 2020 census, its population was 105.

Alexandria is part of the Fort Madison-Keokuk micropolitan area.

== History ==
Alexandria was founded in the 1830s. The community was named after John Alexander, the proprietor of a nearby ferry. A post office called Alexandria has been in operation since 1840.

== Geography ==
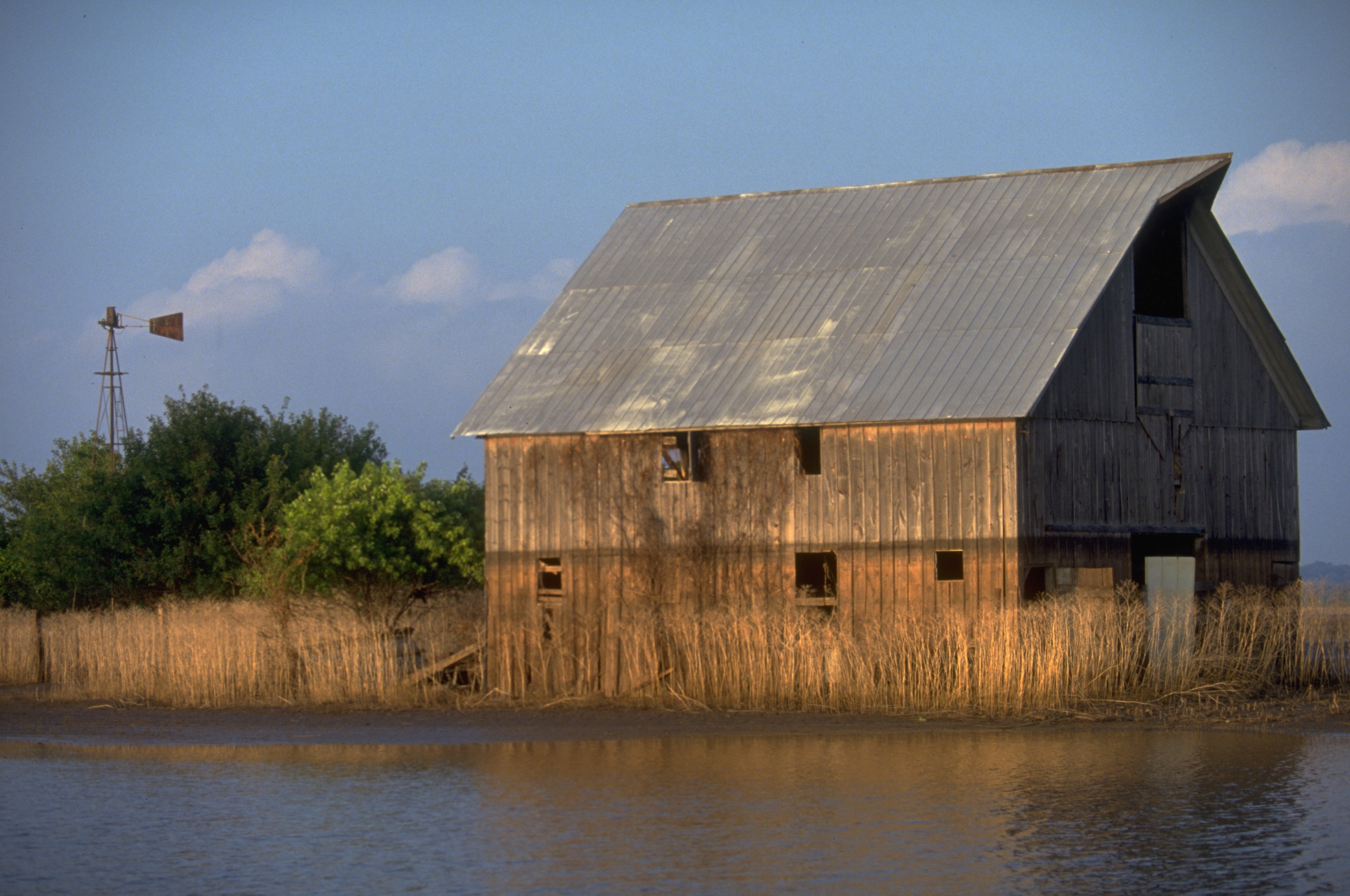
Great Flood of 1993, with the Mississippi River out of its banks in Alexandria.

Alexandria is located in northeast Clark County adjacent to the Mississippi River. The city is on combined US routes 61 and 136. Wayland is approximately seven miles to the west on Route 136 and Keokuk, Iowa is five miles to the northeast on Route 136. Warsaw, Illinois lies across the Mississippi about 1.5 miles to the east.

According to the United States Census Bureau, the city has a total area of 0.39 square miles (1.01 km^{2}), of which 0.38 square miles (0.98 km^{2}) is land and 0.01 square miles (0.03 km^{2}) is water.

Located along the Mississippi River, Alexandria is prone to flooding, with large swaths of the area submerged during the Great Flood of 1993.

== Demographics ==
Historical population
Census	Pop.	Note	%±
1860	952		—
1870	688		−27.7%
1880	760		10.5%
1890	536		−29.5%
1950	465		—
1960	452		−2.8%
1970	453		0.2%
1980	417		−7.9%
1990	341		−18.2%
2000	166		−51.3%
2010	159		−4.2%
2020	105		−34.0%
U.S. Decennial Census

=== 2010 census ===
As of the census of 2010, there were 159 people, 67 households, and 45 families living in the city. The population density was 418.4 inhabitants per square mile (161.5/km^{2}). There were 77 housing units at an average density of 202.6 per square mile (78.2/km^{2}). The racial makeup of the city was 96.9% White, 0.6% African American, and 2.5% from two or more races.

There were 67 households, of which 31.3% had children under the age of 18 living with them, 50.7% were married couples living together, 13.4% had a female householder with no husband present, 3.0% had a male householder with no wife present, and 32.8% were non-families. 28.4% of all households were made up of individuals, and 7.5% had someone living alone who was 65 years of age or older. The average household size was 2.37 and the average family size was 2.93.

The median age in the city was 41.5 years. 24.5% of residents were under the age of 18; 5% were between the ages of 18 and 24; 26.4% were from 25 to 44; 32% were from 45 to 64; and 11.9% were 65 years of age or older. The gender makeup of the city was 54.1% male and 45.9% female.

=== 2000 census ===
As of the census of 2000, there were 166 people, 70 households, and 45 families living in the city. The population density was 443.7 inhabitants per square mile (171.3/km^{2}). There were 79 housing units at an average density of 211.2 per square mile (81.5/km^{2}). The racial makeup of the city was 98.80% White and 1.20% African American.

There were 70 households, out of which 31.4% had children under the age of 18 living with them, 55.7% were married couples living together, 2.9% had a female householder with no husband present, and 35.7% were non-families. 31.4% of all households were made up of individuals, and 11.4% had someone living alone who was 65 years of age or older. The average household size was 2.37 and the average family size was 2.91.

In the city the population was spread out, with 24.7% under the age of 18, 7.2% from 18 to 24, 31.3% from 25 to 44, 21.1% from 45 to 64, and 15.7% who were 65 years of age or older. The median age was 39 years. For every 100 females, there were 104.9 males. For every 100 females age 18 and over, there were 104.9 males.

The median income for a household in the city was $30,000, and the median income for a family was $32,000. Males had a median income of $30,000 versus $20,833 for females. The per capita income for the city was $13,404. About 6.7% of families and 6.4% of the population were below the poverty line, including none of those under the age of 18 and 16.7% of those 65 or over.

== Education ==
It is in the Clark County R-1 School District.

Running Fox Elementary School is in proximity to Alexandria. It is near a four-lane highway. Superintendent Ritchie Kracht stated that the school "is out there in the middle of the country" and far from emergency services.

The district's comprehensive high school is Clark County High School.

== See also ==
- List of cities in Missouri
