= Revere C-3 School District =

School district in Missouri, United States

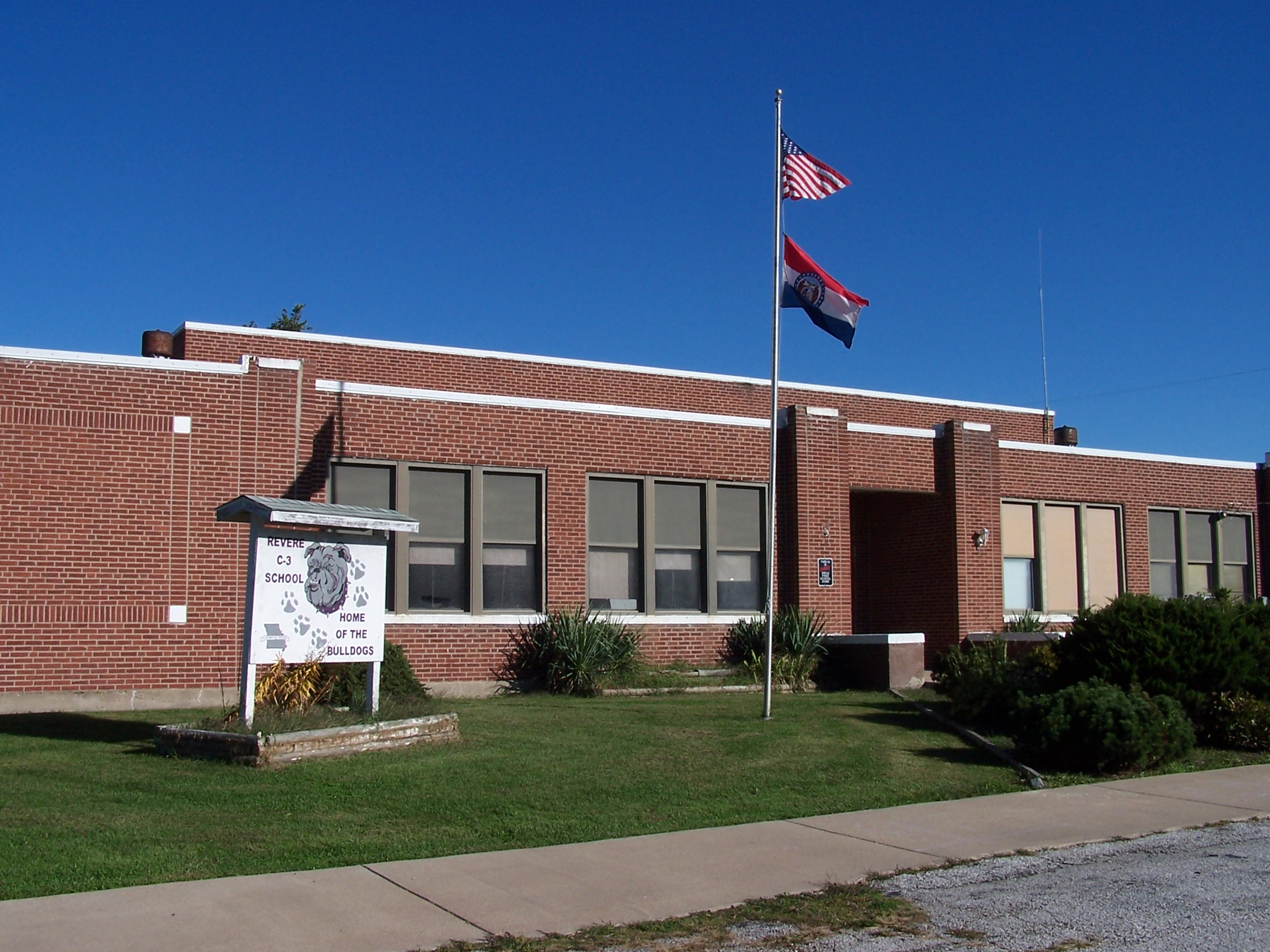
Revere Elementary School

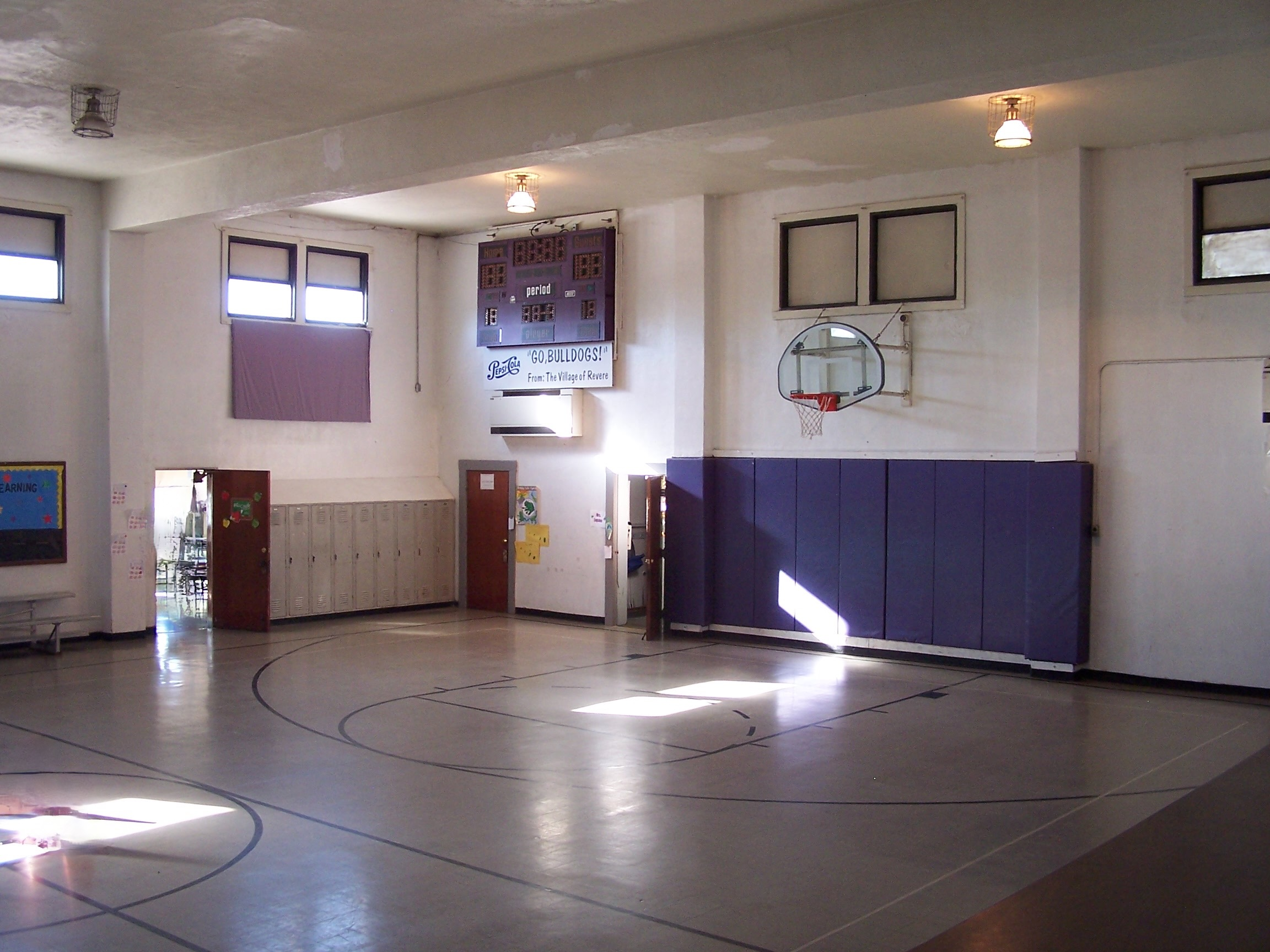
Revere school gymnasium (2010)

Revere C-3 School District was a school district headquartered in Revere, Missouri.

== History ==
The district began operations in 1924. It was a K-12 school district until 2002, when it ended its high school operations. Students began going to Clark County High School, operated by the Clark County R-1 School District. Jim Morris, a spokesperson for the Missouri Department of Elementary and Secondary Education, cited this result as an example of struggling school districts in rural areas in northern Missouri.

In Fall 2011 the enrollment was 29. The school had kindergarten available, but at the time there were no kindergarten students. By April 2012, the enrollment was 16. That month, there were some people using addresses from children's grandparents to send them to the K-8 program in the Clark County R-I district, even though Missouri law did not allow for school districts to enroll students from other districts without formal agreements.

A person in the community learned about the maximum tax rate, which was set in the 1990s, and, in August 2011, filed a petition to have the school district merged into the Clark County School District. In May 2012 a referendum was held on consolidating with Clark County R-1, and the votes were in favor. The district closed in May 2012, consolidating into the Clark County R-1 School District. At the time, enrollment was 17.
