= Missouri Route 81 =

State highway in Missouri, U.S.

Route 81
- Route 81 highlighted in red

Route information
- Maintained by MoDOT
- Length: 40.954 mi (65.909 km)

Major junctions
- South end: Route 16 west of Canton
- US 136 south of Kahoka
- North end: Iowa 81 near Farmington, IA

Location
- Country: United States
- State: Missouri

Highway system
- Missouri State Highway System; Interstate; US; State; Supplemental
← Route 80	→ Route 82

Route 81 is a highway in northeastern Missouri. Its northern terminus is at the Iowa state line where it continues as Iowa Highway 81. Its southern terminus is at Route 16 west of Canton.

== Route description ==
Route 81 starts at the Iowa state line from Iowa Route 81. It continues south into the town of Kahoka and then intersects with US Route 136. As it continues south, there are several sharp turns. It ends outside of the town Canton, near an interchange with US 61 and intersects with Route 16. The route starts in Clark county and ends in Lewis county.

== Major intersections ==
County	Location	mi	km	Destinations	Notes
Lewis	Canton	0.000	0.000	Route 16 to US 61	
Lewis	Canton Township	7.306	11.758	Route E	
Clark	Jackson Township	12.701	20.440	Route Z	
Clark	Jackson–Union township line	21.676	34.884	Route D	
Clark	Lincoln Township	24.696	39.744	Route H	
Clark	Lincoln Township	25.197	40.551	Route Y	
Clark	Kahoka	26.329	42.372	US 136	
Clark	Kahoka	26.683	42.942	US 136 Bus. / Route EE (Main Street)	
Clark	Jefferson Township	32.878	52.912	Route NN	
Clark	Jefferson Township	33.138	53.330	Route C	
Clark	Grant Township	38.370	61.751	Route CC	
Clark	Grant Township	39.903	64.218	Route V	
Clark	Grant Township	40.954	65.909	Iowa 81 north	Continuation into Iowa
1.000 mi = 1.609 km; 1.000 km = 0.621 mi
