= Grant Township, Clark County, Missouri =

Township in Clark County, Missouri, U.S.

Coordinates: 40.5839°N 91.7472°W

Grant Township is an inactive township in Clark County, in the U.S. state of Missouri.

Grant Township was established in 1868, taking its name from President Ulysses S. Grant.
