= Col. Hiram M. Hiller House =

Historic house in Missouri, United States

- U.S. National Register of Historic Places
- Location within Missouri Location within the United States
- Location: 520 N. Washington, Kahoka, Missouri
- Coordinates: 40°25′30″N 91°43′20″W
- Area: less than one acre
- Built: 1874
- Architectural style: Italianate, Vernacular Italianate
- NRHP reference No.: 86001927
- Added to NRHP: July 21, 1986

Col. Hiram M. Hiller House is a historic home located at Kahoka, Clark County, Missouri. It was built in 1874, and is a two-story, vernacular Italianate style frame dwelling. It has a rear ell and wraparound porch with a truncated hipped roof.

It was listed on the National Register of Historic Places in 1986.
