= Fox River (Mississippi River tributary) =

Stream in the US states of Iowa and Missouri

The Fox River is a stream in Davis, and Van Buren counties of Iowa, and Clark County of Missouri. It is a tributary of the Mississippi River.

The stream headwaters are at 40°45′13″N 92°43′26″W near Drakesville and Bloomfield, Iowa. It crosses the Iowa-Missouri border near Mt Sterling, and its confluence with the Mississippi is about six miles south of the confluence of the Des Moines River, near Alexandria at 40°17′05″N 91°29′39″W.

The Fox River was named after the Meskwaki or Fox people.

At Wayland, Missouri, the river has an average discharge of 283 cubic feet per second.

== Tributaries ==
- Wade Branch

== See also ==
- List of rivers of Iowa
- List of rivers of Missouri
