= Revere, Missouri =

City in Clark County, Missouri, United States

- City
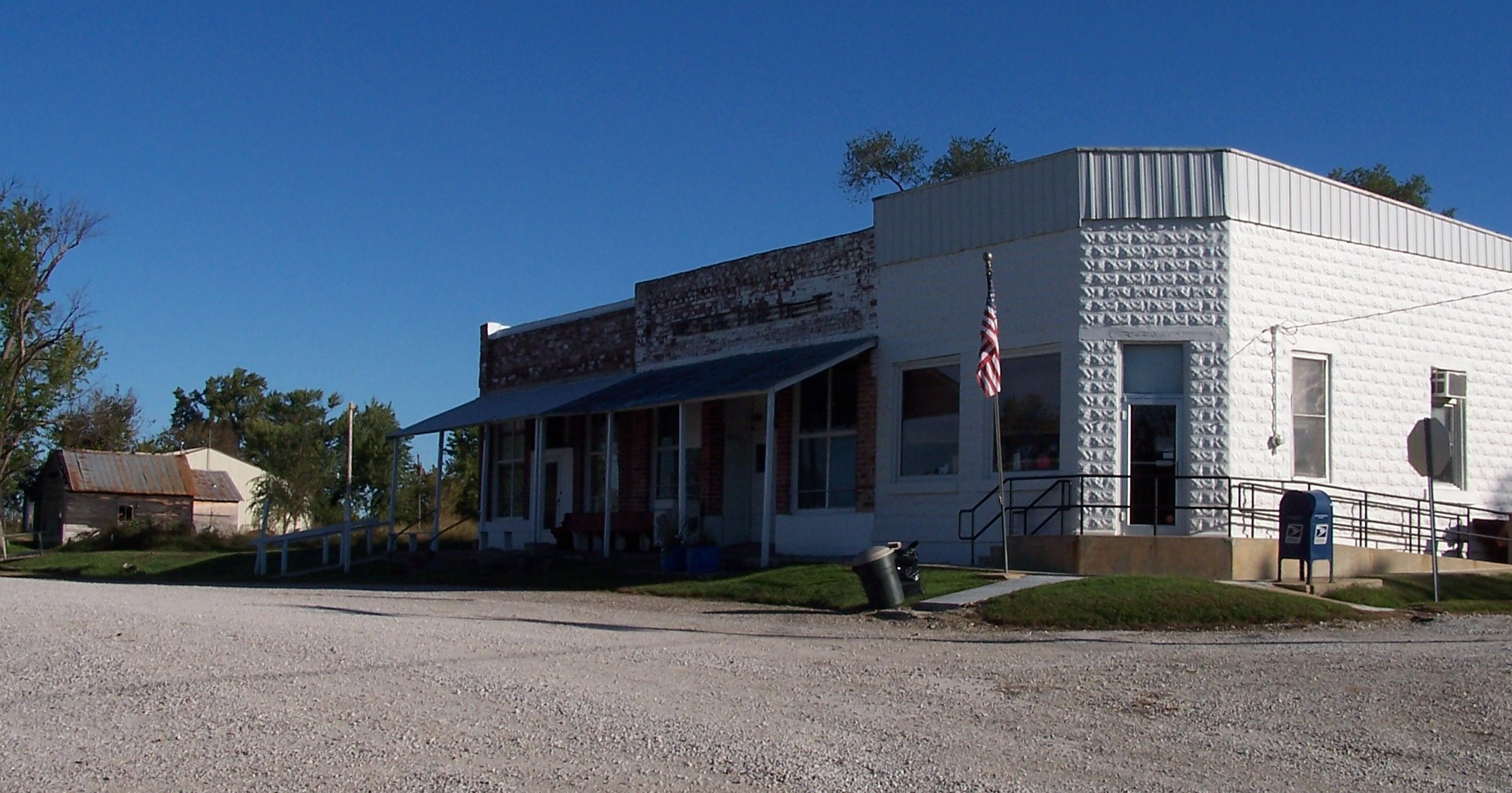
- Community center, US Postal Office

- Location of Revere, Missouri
- Coordinates: 40°29′40″N 91°40′35″W
- Country: United States
- State: Missouri
- County: Clark

Area
  - Total: 0.19 sq mi (0.48 km^{2})
  - Land: 0.19 sq mi (0.48 km^{2})
  - Water: 0 sq mi (0.00 km^{2})
- Elevation: 682 ft (208 m)

Population (2020)
  - Total: 76
  - Density: 409.1/sq mi (157.97/km^{2})
- Time zone: UTC-6 (Central (CST))
  - Summer (DST): UTC-5 (CDT)
- ZIP code: 63465
- Area code: 660
- FIPS code: 29-61292
- GNIS feature ID: 2396874

Revere is a city in Clark County, Missouri, United States. As of the 2020 census, its population was 76. It is part of the Fort Madison–Keokuk, IA-MO Micropolitan Statistical Area.

== History ==
Founded on October 22, 1887, by the Santa Fe Railroad, Revere was "probably named in honor of Paul Revere." During the period prior to 1900, Revere flourished as an intermediate stop for the railroad. In 1898, Revere was incorporated as a city in the 4th class of Missouri.

In 1898, J. H. Talbott of Luray started the Revere Weekly Current, a weekly newspaper that consisted of five pages of world and local news including advertisements, train schedules and local markets. Circulation closed on July 18, 1901, when Talbott left for law school.

Located at the former site of the Revere Methodist Church, Ar-Del Park was dedicated on May 30, 1946, as a memorial to Revere natives John Arnold Wallace and Delmar Brown, who died serving their country during World War II. A large boulder with a plaque dedicated to all Clark County veterans is located in the park.

On July 26, 2011, the United States Postal Service announced plans to consider closing the Revere post office as part of a nationwide restructuring plan. On May 9, 2012, it was announced that a new strategy would preserve the nation's smallest post offices, reversing the earlier plan.

== Geography ==
Revere is located in northern Clark County three miles from the Missouri-Iowa state line. The Atchison, Topeka and Santa Fe Railroad passes through the community.

According to the United States Census Bureau, the city has a total area of 0.19 square miles (0.49 km^{2}), all land.

== Demographics ==
Historical population
Census	Pop.	Note	%±
1900	161		—
1910	196		21.7%
1920	187		−4.6%
1930	182		−2.7%
1940	191		4.9%
1950	180		−5.8%
1960	190		5.6%
1970	184		−3.2%
1980	191		3.8%
1990	133		−30.4%
2000	121		−9.0%
2010	79		−34.7%
2020	76		−3.8%
Decennial US Census

=== 2010 census ===
As of the census of 2010, there were 79 people, 36 households, and 24 families residing in the city. The population density was 415.8 inhabitants per square mile (160.5/km^{2}). There were 41 housing units at an average density of 215.8 per square mile (83.3/km^{2}). The racial makeup of the city was 98.7% White, 1.3% from other races. Hispanic or Latino of any race were 1.3% of the population.

There were 36 households, of which 16.7% had children under the age of 18 living with them, 58.3% were married couples living together, 5.6% had a female householder with no husband present, and 33.3% were non-families. 33.3% of all households were made up of individuals, and 2.8% had someone living alone who was 65 years of age or older. The average household size was 2.19 and the average family size was 2.71.

In the city, the population was spread out, with 21.5% under the age of 20, 2.5% from 20 to 24, 19.0% from 25 to 44, 43.0% from 45 to 64, and 13.9% who were 65 years of age or older. The median age was 49 years. For every 100 females, there were 113.5 males. For every 100 females age 18 and over, there were 106.5 males.

== Transportation ==
Amtrak’s Southwest Chief, which operates between Los Angeles and Chicago, passes through the town on BNSF tracks, but makes no stop. The nearest station is located in Fort Madison, 33 miles (53 km) to the northeast.

== Education ==
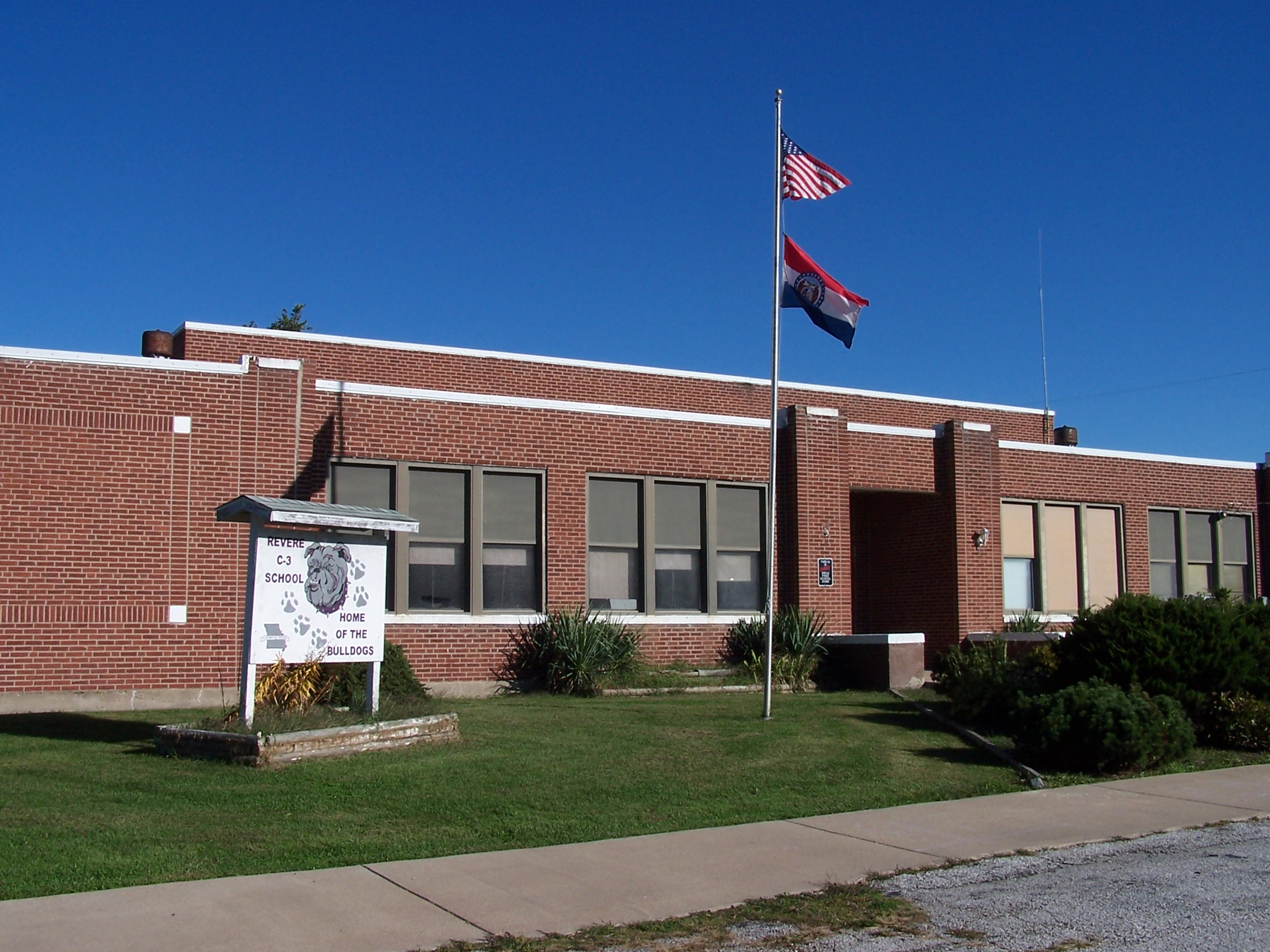
Revere Elementary School

It is in the Clark County R-1 School District. The district's comprehensive high school is Clark County High School.

It was previously in the Revere C-3 School District, which began in 1924. In 2002 the Revere district ended its high school and began sending students to Clark County High. Continued declining enrollment led to a vote in April 2012 that resulted in the decision to close the school and annex it to the Clark County R-1 school district effective July 1, 2012.

== See also ==
- List of cities in Missouri
