= Wayland, Missouri =

- City
- Location of Wayland, Missouri
- Coordinates: 40°23′47″N 91°34′32″W
- Country: United States
- State: Missouri
- County: Clark

Area
  - Total: 0.67 sq mi (1.74 km^{2})
  - Land: 0.67 sq mi (1.74 km^{2})
  - Water: 0 sq mi (0.00 km^{2})
- Elevation: 535 ft (163 m)

Population (2020)
  - Total: 408
  - Density: 606.6/sq mi (234.21/km^{2})
- Time zone: UTC-6 (Central (CST))
  - Summer (DST): UTC-5 (CDT)
- ZIP code: 63472
- Area code: 660
- FIPS code: 29-77920
- GNIS feature ID: 2397232
- Website: wayland.municipalimpact.com

Wayland is a city in Clark County, Missouri, United States. As of the 2020 census, its population was 408. It is part of the Fort Madison–Keokuk, IA-MO Micropolitan Statistical Area.

== History ==
Wayland was laid out in 1880. The city was named for Jerre Wayland, a pioneer settler. A post office called Wayland has been in operation since 1874.

Sickles Tavern was listed on the National Register of Historic Places in 1986.

== Geography ==
Wayland is located on US Route 136 between Kahoka seven miles to the west and Alexandria 6.5 miles to the east-southeast. The Fox River flows past the west side of the city.

According to the United States Census Bureau, the city has a total area of 0.67 square miles (1.74 km^{2}), all land.

== Demographics ==
Historical population
Census	Pop.	Note	%±
1910	384		—
1920	355		−7.6%
1930	385		8.5%
1940	380		−1.3%
1950	350		−7.9%
1960	384		9.7%
1970	467		21.6%
1980	498		6.6%
1990	391		−21.5%
2000	425		8.7%
2010	533		25.4%
2020	408		−23.5%
U.S. Decennial Census

=== 2010 census ===
As of the census of 2010, there were 533 people, 233 households, and 138 families living in the city. The population density was 795.5 inhabitants per square mile (307.1/km^{2}). There were 249 housing units at an average density of 371.6 per square mile (143.5/km^{2}). The racial makeup of the city was 98.5% White, 0.2% African American, 0.4% Asian, 0.2% from other races, and 0.8% from two or more races. Hispanic or Latino of any race were 0.6% of the population.

There were 233 households, of which 29.2% had children under the age of 18 living with them, 43.3% were married couples living together, 7.7% had a female householder with no husband present, 8.2% had a male householder with no wife present, and 40.8% were non-families. 35.2% of all households were made up of individuals, and 13.3% had someone living alone who was 65 years of age or older. The average household size was 2.29 and the average family size was 2.92.

The median age in the city was 38.9 years. 24.6% of residents were under the age of 18; 7.9% were between the ages of 18 and 24; 23.6% were from 25 to 44; 27.9% were from 45 to 64; and 15.9% were 65 years of age or older. The gender makeup of the city was 48.6% male and 51.4% female.

=== 2000 census ===
As of the census of 2000, there were 425 people, 196 households, and 111 families living in the city. The population density was 1,549.6 inhabitants per square mile (598.3/km^{2}). There were 220 housing units at an average density of 802.1 per square mile (309.7/km^{2}). The racial makeup of the city was 99.53% White, and 0.47% from two or more races. Hispanic or Latino of any race were 0.94% of the population.

There were 196 households, out of which 23.0% had children under the age of 18 living with them, 41.8% were married couples living together, 8.7% had a female householder with no husband present, and 42.9% were non-families. 38.3% of all households were made up of individuals, and 24.5% had someone living alone who was 65 years of age or older. The average household size was 2.17 and the average family size was 2.83.

In the city the population was spread out, with 23.5% under the age of 18, 9.9% from 18 to 24, 22.1% from 25 to 44, 24.0% from 45 to 64, and 20.5% who were 65 years of age or older. The median age was 39 years. For every 100 females, there were 92.3 males. For every 100 females age 18 and over, there were 89.0 males.

The median income for a household in the city was $19,034, and the median income for a family was $25,179. Males had a median income of $23,750 versus $20,227 for females. The per capita income for the city was $11,240. About 15.9% of families and 19.5% of the population were below the poverty line, including 34.4% of those under age 18 and 14.0% of those age 65 or over.

== Education ==
It is in the Clark County R-1 School District. The district's comprehensive high school is Clark County High School.
