= Kahoka, Missouri =

City in Missouri, U.S.

- City
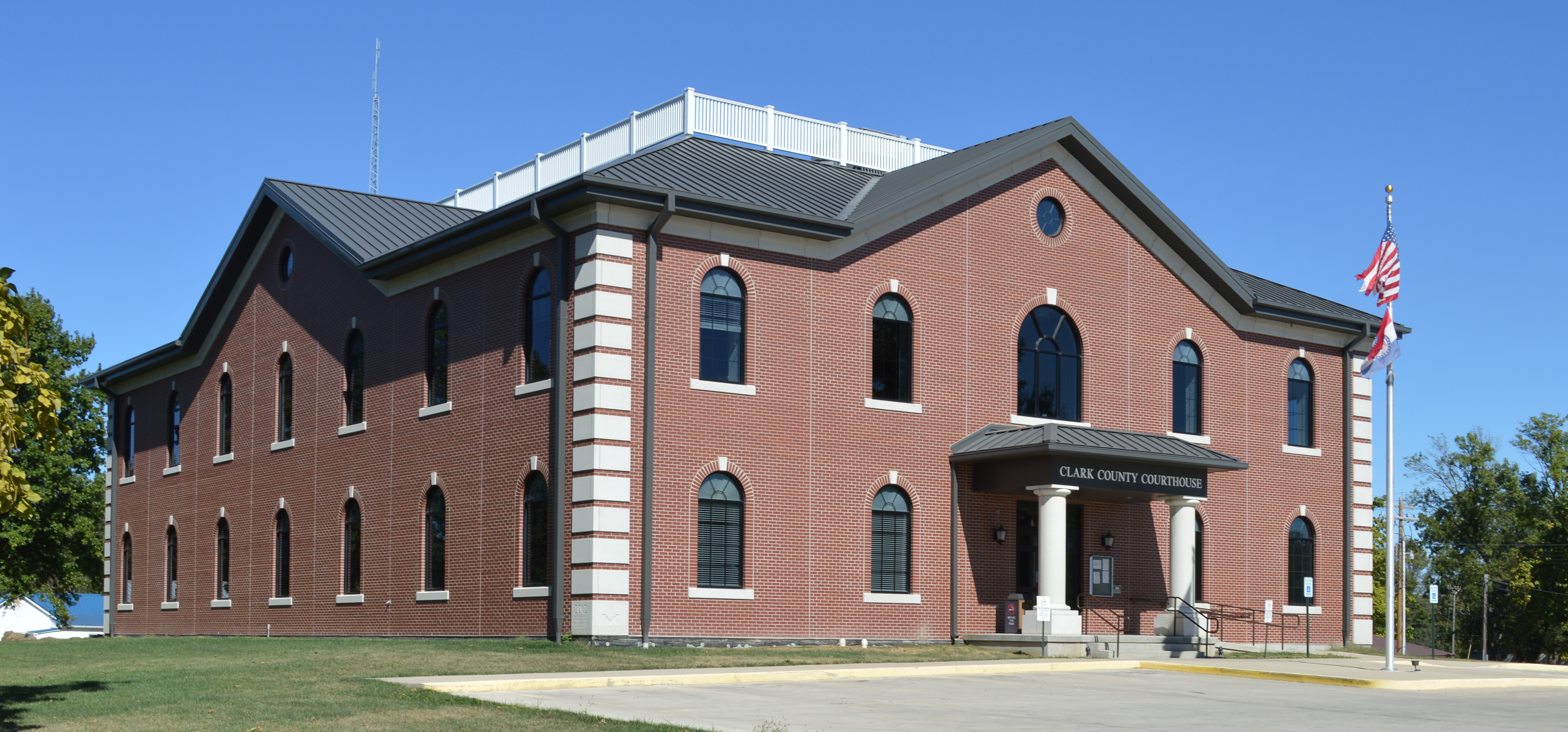

- Location within Clark County and Missouri
- Coordinates: 40°25′26″N 91°43′07″W
- Country: United States
- State: Missouri
- County: Clark

Area
  - Total: 1.62 sq mi (4.19 km^{2})
  - Land: 1.59 sq mi (4.11 km^{2})
  - Water: 0.031 sq mi (0.08 km^{2})
- Elevation: 696 ft (212 m)

Population (2020)
  - Total: 1,961
  - Density: 1,236.6/sq mi (477.46/km^{2})
- Time zone: UTC-6 (Central (CST))
  - Summer (DST): UTC-5 (CDT)
- ZIP code: 63445
- Area code: 660
- FIPS code: 29-37790
- GNIS feature ID: 2395484
- Website: www.kahoka.city

Kahoka (/kəˈhoʊkə/ kə-HOH-kə) is a city in and the county seat of Clark County, Missouri, United States. As of the 2020 census, its population was 1,961.

== History ==
Kahoka was platted in 1858. The city is named for the historic Cahokia tribe of the Illiniwek or Illinois Confederacy, which occupied territory on both sides of the Mississippi River in this area at the time of European encounter.

The Clark County Courthouse, Col. Hiram M. Hiller House, and Montgomery Opera House are listed on the National Register of Historic Places.

== Geography ==
Kahoka is located at the intersection of U.S. Route 136 and Missouri Route 81. Wayland is approximately seven miles to the east and Luray is 8.5 miles to the west. The Fox River flows past about one mile to the northeast.

According to the United States Census Bureau, the city has a total area of 1.60 square miles (4.14 km^{2}), of which 1.57 square miles (4.07 km^{2}) is land and 0.03 square miles (0.08 km^{2}) is water.

== Demographics ==
Historical population
| Census | Pop. | Note | %± |
|---|---|---|---|
| 1880 | 704 | | — |
| 1890 | 1,425 | | 102.4% |
| 1900 | 1,818 | | 27.6% |
| 1910 | 1,758 | | −3.3% |
| 1920 | 1,624 | | −7.6% |
| 1930 | 1,507 | | −7.2% |
| 1940 | 1,781 | | 18.2% |
| 1950 | 1,847 | | 3.7% |
| 1960 | 2,160 | | 16.9% |
| 1970 | 2,207 | | 2.2% |
| 1980 | 2,101 | | −4.8% |
| 1990 | 2,195 | | 4.5% |
| 2000 | 2,241 | | 2.1% |
| 2010 | 2,078 | | −7.3% |
| 2020 | 1,961 | | −5.6% |
Decennial US Census

Kahoka is part of the Fort Madison–Keokuk, IA-MO Micropolitan Statistical Area.

=== 2020 census ===
As of the 2020 census, Kahoka had a population of 1,961. The median age was 43.3 years. 23.0% of residents were under the age of 18 and 23.7% of residents were 65 years of age or older. For every 100 females there were 87.8 males, and for every 100 females age 18 and over there were 84.5 males age 18 and over.

0.0% of residents lived in urban areas, while 100.0% lived in rural areas.

There were 872 households in Kahoka, of which 29.9% had children under the age of 18 living in them. Of all households, 39.7% were married-couple households, 19.5% were households with a male householder and no spouse or partner present, and 34.1% were households with a female householder and no spouse or partner present. About 38.9% of all households were made up of individuals and 19.7% had someone living alone who was 65 years of age or older.

There were 939 housing units, of which 7.1% were vacant. The homeowner vacancy rate was 2.0% and the rental vacancy rate was 5.6%.

Racial composition as of the 2020 census
| Race | Number | Percent |
|---|---|---|
| White | 1,896 | 96.7% |
| Black or African American | 4 | 0.2% |
| American Indian and Alaska Native | 1 | 0.1% |
| Asian | 1 | 0.1% |
| Native Hawaiian and Other Pacific Islander | 0 | 0.0% |
| Some other race | 6 | 0.3% |
| Two or more races | 53 | 2.7% |
| Hispanic or Latino (of any race) | 23 | 1.2% |

=== 2010 census ===
As of the census of 2010, there were 2,078 people, 883 households, and 521 families living in the city. The population density was 1,323.6 inhabitants per square mile (511.0/km^{2}). There were 1,001 housing units at an average density of 637.6 per square mile (246.2/km^{2}). The racial makeup of the city was 98.5% White, 0.2% African American, 0.1% Native American, 0.2% Asian, 0.1% from other races, and 0.8% from two or more races. Hispanic or Latino of any race were 0.7% of the population.

There were 883 households, of which 30.2% had children under the age of 18 living with them, 43.0% were married couples living together, 10.5% had a female householder with no husband present, 5.4% had a male householder with no wife present, and 41.0% were non-families. 36.0% of all households were made up of individuals, and 18.6% had someone living alone who was 65 years of age or older. The average household size was 2.25 and the average family size was 2.92.

The median age in the city was 39.9 years. 23.7% of residents were under the age of 18; 8.5% were between the ages of 18 and 24; 23.1% were from 25 to 44; 23.6% were from 45 to 64; and 21% were 65 years of age or older. The gender makeup of the city was 46.5% male and 53.5% female.

=== 2000 census ===
As of the census of 2000, there were 2,241 people, 921 households, and 562 families living in the city. The population density was 1,464.0 inhabitants per square mile (565.3/km^{2}). There were 1,014 housing units at an average density of 662.4 per square mile (255.8/km^{2}). The racial makeup of the city was 98.48% White, 0.09% African American, 0.40% Native American, 0.002% Dutch, 0.04% Asian, 0.13% from other races, and 0.85% from two or more races. Hispanic or Latino of any race were 0.80% of the population.

There were 921 households, out of which 30.5% had children under the age of 18 living with them, 47.2% were married couples living together, 9.6% had a female householder with no husband present, and 38.9% were non-families. 35.4% of all households were made up of individuals, and 20.5% had someone living alone who was 65 years of age or older. The average household size was 2.31 and the average family size was 3.01.

In the city, the population was spread out, with 25.3% under the age of 18, 8.3% from 18 to 24, 24.1% from 25 to 44, 19.9% from 45 to 64, and 22.5% who were 65 years of age or older. The median age was 39 years. For every 100 females, there were 86.1 males. For every 100 females age 18 and over, there were 78.2 males.

The median income for a household in the city was $24,384, and the median income for a family was $30,192. Males had a median income of $24,313 versus $16,563 for females. The per capita income for the city was $14,928. About 15.4% of families and 17.4% of the population were below the poverty line, including 21.1% of those under age 18 and 18.8% of those age 65 or over.

== Education ==
Public education in Kahoka is administered by Clark County R-1 School District, which operates two elementary schools, one middle school, and Clark County High School.

Kahoka has a public library, the H. E. Sever Memorial Branch Library.

== Notable people ==
- Ralph Bell, played for Chicago White Sox in 1912
- William Bishop, businessman, military officer, politician, State Treasurer of Missouri from 1865 to 1869
- John Conner, musician, marimbist
- Hiram Hiller, Jr., physician, medical missionary, explorer, ethnographer
- Matt Murphy, professional wrestler
- Neil Smelser, sociologist
- Ramo Stott, stock car driver
- Richard Webber, federal judge
- William Wheat, U.S. Representative from Illinois

== See also ==
- List of cities in Missouri
- Avenue of the Saints
- Battle of Athens (1861)
- Honey War
- List of May 2003 tornado outbreak sequence tornadoes
