= Clark County, Missouri =

County in Missouri, United States

- County
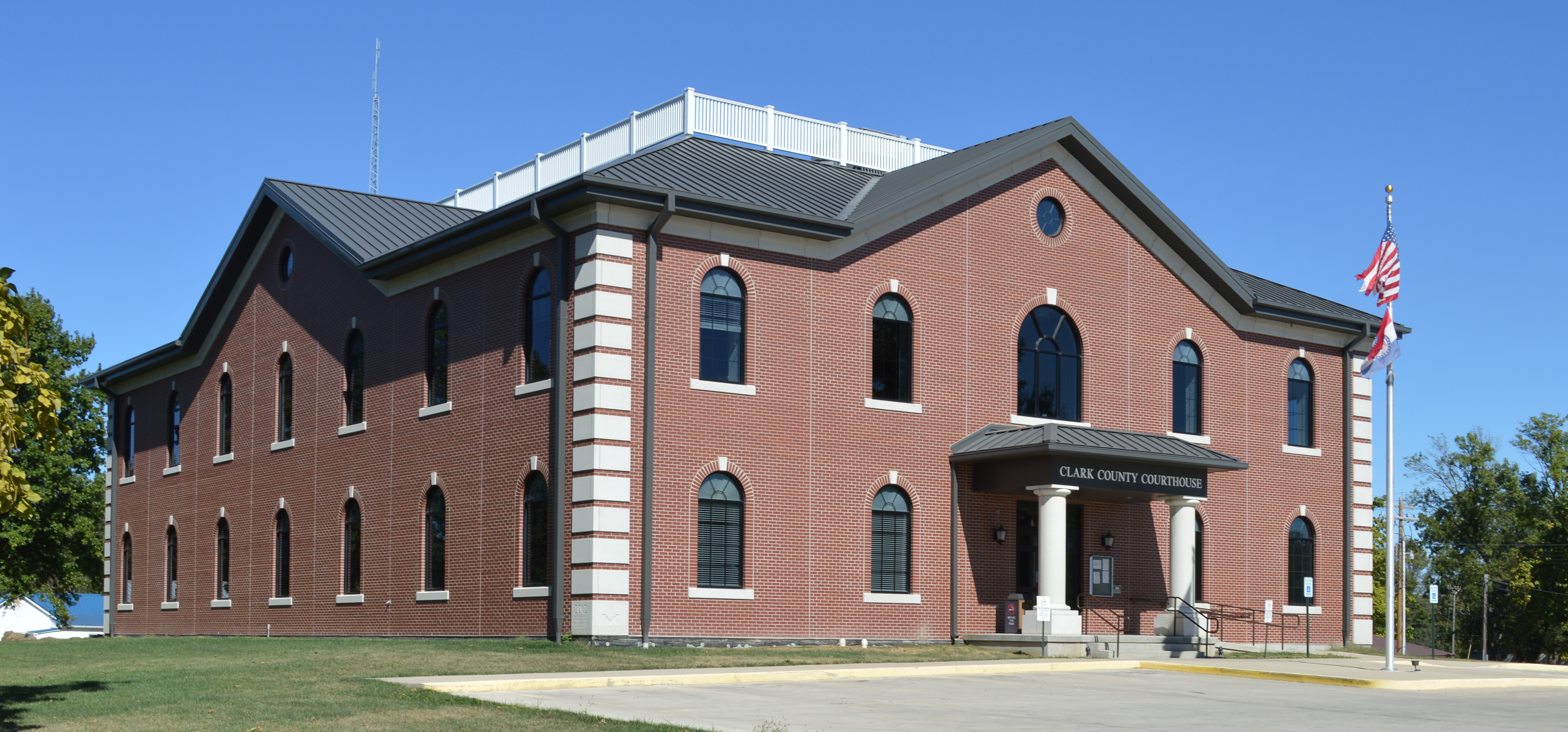
- Clark County Courthouse in Kahoka

- Location within the U.S. state of Missouri
- Coordinates: 40°25′N 91°44′W
- Country: United States
- State: Missouri
- Founded: December 16, 1836
- Named for: William Clark
- Seat: Kahoka
- Largest city: Kahoka

Area
  - Total: 512 sq mi (1,330 km^{2})
  - Land: 505 sq mi (1,310 km^{2})
  - Water: 7.1 sq mi (18 km^{2}) 1.4%

Population (2020)
  - Total: 6,634
  - Estimate (2025): 6,475 ▼
  - Density: 13.1/sq mi (5.07/km^{2})
- Time zone: UTC−6 (Central)
  - Summer (DST): UTC−5 (CDT)
- Congressional district: 6th
- Website: https://clarkcountymo.org/

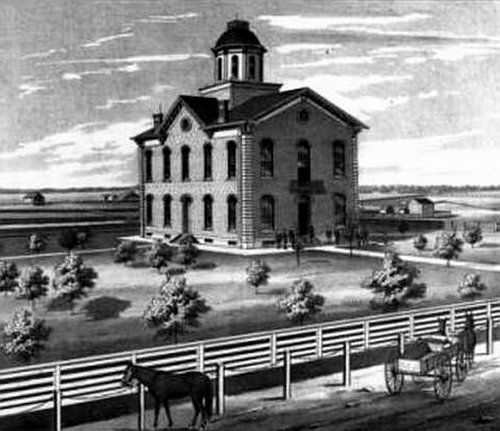
The Clark County, Missouri courthouse as it appeared circa 1878.

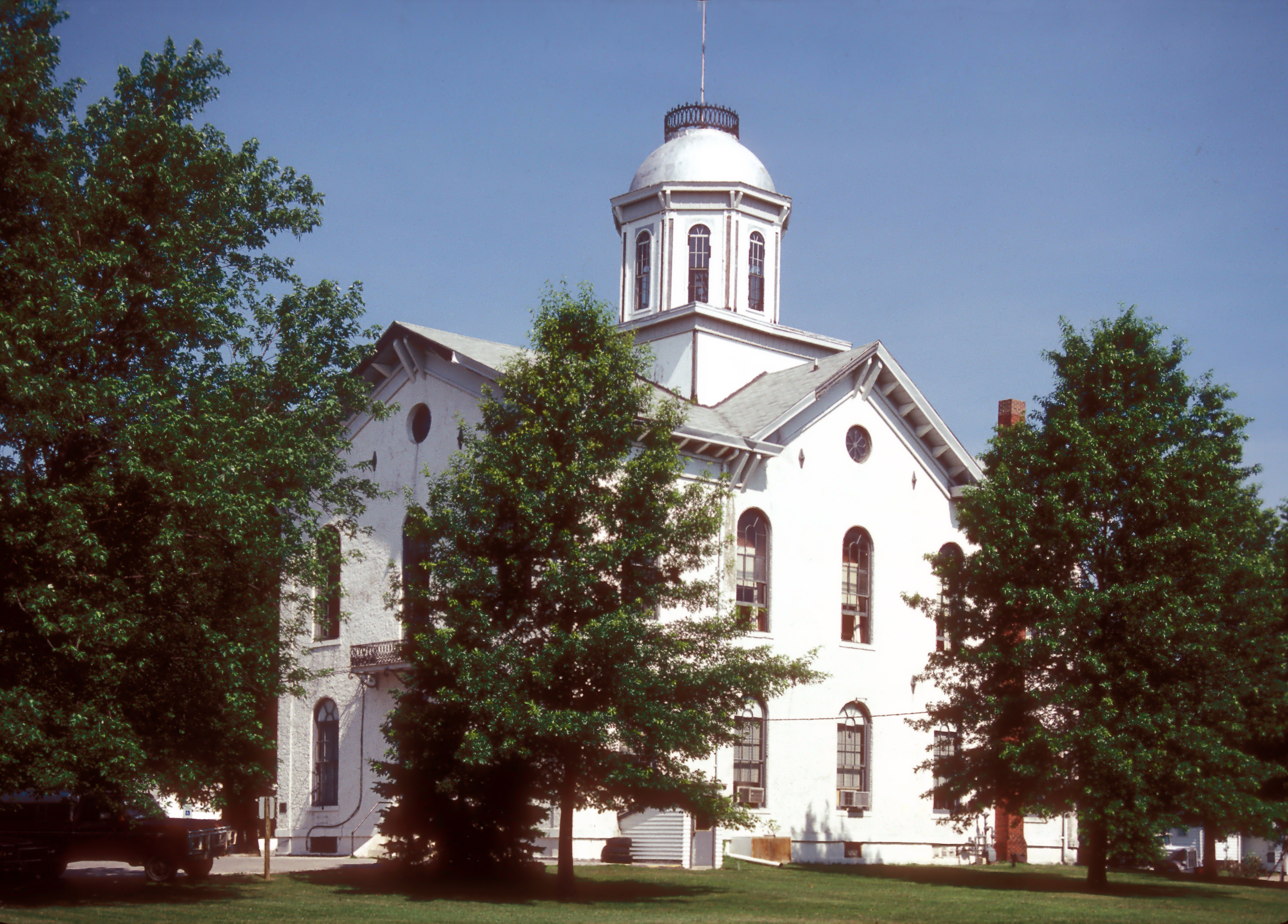
Clark County Courthouse in 2007. It was demolished in 2010 despite being on the National Register of Historic Places.

Clark County is a county located in the northeastern corner of the U.S. state of Missouri. As of the 2020 census, its population was 6,634. Its county seat is Kahoka. The county was organized December 16, 1836, and named for William Clark, leader of the Lewis and Clark Expedition and later Governor of Missouri Territory.

Clark County is part of the Fort Madison–Keokuk, IA-IL-MO Micropolitan Statistical Area.

== History ==
Missouri folklorist Margot Ford McMillen wrote that early settlers were attracted by Clark County's good and inexpensive agricultural land. One section was called "Bit Nation" because land was sold there for just twelve and one-half cents ("one bit" of a Spanish dollar) an acre. In 1861, the Battle of Athens during the American Civil War took place in the town of Athens, Missouri in Clark County. The Battle of Athens Historical Site is a state park in Clark County at the site of the battle.

== Geography ==
According to the U.S. Census Bureau, the county has a total area of 512 square miles (1,330 km^{2}), of which 505 square miles (1,310 km^{2}) is land and 7.1 square miles (18 km^{2}) (1.4%) is water.

=== Adjacent counties ===
- Van Buren County, Iowa (north)
- Lee County, Iowa (northeast)
- Hancock County, Illinois (east)
- Lewis County (south)
- Knox County (southwest)
- Scotland County (west)

=== Major highways ===
- U.S. Route 61
- U.S. Route 136
- Route 27
- Route 81

=== National protected area ===
- Great River National Wildlife Refuge (part)

== Demographics ==
Historical population
Census	Pop.	Note	%±
1840	2,846		—
1850	5,527		94.2%
1860	11,684		111.4%
1870	13,667		17.0%
1880	15,031		10.0%
1890	15,126		0.6%
1900	15,383		1.7%
1910	12,811		−16.7%
1920	11,874		−7.3%
1930	10,254		−13.6%
1940	10,166		−0.9%
1950	9,003		−11.4%
1960	8,725		−3.1%
1970	8,260		−5.3%
1980	8,493		2.8%
1990	7,547		−11.1%
2000	7,416		−1.7%
2010	7,139		−3.7%
2020	6,634		−7.1%
2025 (est.)	6,475	▼	−2.4%
U.S. Decennial Census; 1790-1960 1900-1990; 1990-2000 2010-2015

=== 2020 census ===
As of the 2020 census, the county had a population of 6,634. The median age was 43.5 years. 23.7% of residents were under the age of 18 and 22.3% of residents were 65 years of age or older. For every 100 females there were 101.8 males, and for every 100 females age 18 and over there were 99.9 males age 18 and over.

The racial makeup of the county was 95.9% White, 0.3% Black or African American, 0.1% American Indian and Alaska Native, 0.2% Asian, 0.0% Native Hawaiian and Pacific Islander, 0.3% from some other race, and 3.2% from two or more races. Hispanic or Latino residents of any race comprised 0.8% of the population.

As of the 2020 census, 0.0% of residents lived in urban areas, while 100.0% lived in rural areas.

There were 2,752 households in the county, of which 28.2% had children under the age of 18 living with them and 23.2% had a female householder with no spouse or partner present. About 31.2% of all households were made up of individuals and 16.1% had someone living alone who was 65 years of age or older.

There were 3,216 housing units, of which 14.4% were vacant. Among occupied housing units, 75.4% were owner-occupied and 24.6% were renter-occupied. The homeowner vacancy rate was 1.4% and the rental vacancy rate was 5.4%.

=== Racial and ethnic composition ===
Clark County, Missouri – Racial and ethnic composition Note: the US Census treats Hispanic/Latino as an ethnic category. This table excludes Latinos from the racial categories and assigns them to a separate category. Hispanics/Latinos may be of any race.
Race / Ethnicity (NH = Non-Hispanic)	Pop 1980	Pop 1990	Pop 2000	Pop 2010	Pop 2020	% 1980	% 1990	% 2000	% 2010	% 2020
White alone (NH)	8,447	7,506	7,294	6,978	6,337	99.46%	99.46%	98.35%	97.74%	95.52%
Black or African American alone (NH)	6	3	5	19	21	0.07%	0.04%	0.07%	0.27%	0.32%
Native American or Alaska Native alone (NH)	3	6	15	8	9	0.04%	0.08%	0.20%	0.11%	0.14%
Asian alone (NH)	7	4	5	22	12	0.08%	0.05%	0.07%	0.31%	0.18%
Native Hawaiian or Pacific Islander alone (NH)	x	x	1	0	0	x	x	0.01%	0.00%	0.00%
Other race alone (NH)	2	2	0	0	10	0.02%	0.03%	0.00%	0.00%	0.15%
Mixed race or Multiracial (NH)	x	x	44	70	195	x	x	0.59%	0.98%	2.94%
Hispanic or Latino (any race)	28	26	52	42	50	0.33%	0.34%	0.70%	0.59%	0.75%
Total	8,493	7,547	7,416	7,139	6,634	100.00%	100.00%	100.00%	100.00%	100.00%

=== 2010 census ===
As of the census of 2010, there were 7,139 people, 2,966 households, and 2,079 families residing in the county. The population density was 15 people per square mile (5.8 people/km^{2}). There were 3,483 housing units at an average density of 7 units per square mile (2.7/km^{2}). The racial makeup of the county was 98.83% White, 0.07% Black or African American, 0.20% Native American, 0.07% Asian, 0.01% Pacific Islander, 0.22% from other races, and 0.61% from two or more races. Approximately 0.70% of the population were Hispanic or Latino of any race.

There were 2,966 households, out of which 30.30% had children under the age of 18 living with them, 58.70% were married couples living together, 7.00% had a female householder with no husband present, and 29.90% were non-families. 26.40% of all households were made up of individuals, and 13.60% had someone living alone who was 65 years of age or older. The average household size was 2.46 and the average family size was 2.95.

In the county, the population was spread out, with 25.00% under the age of 18, 7.80% from 18 to 24, 25.50% from 25 to 44, 25.00% from 45 to 64, and 16.70% who were 65 years of age or older. The median age was 39 years. For every 100 females, there were 97.60 males. For every 100 females age 18 and over, there were 94.00 males.

The median income for a household in the county was $29,457, and the median income for a family was $36,270. Males had a median income of $27,279 versus $19,917 for females. The per capita income for the county was $15,988. About 10.80% of families and 14.10% of the population were below the poverty line, including 19.70% of those under age 18 and 12.70% of those age 65 or over.

== Education ==
There are four school districts covering portions of the county, including those which have schools and/or administration buildings in other counties:

- Canton R-V School District
- Clark County R-1 School District
- Lewis County C-1 School District
- Scotland County R-I School District

Wyaconda C-1 School District closed in 2008. The Revere C-3 School District closed in 2012. The Luray school district closed its doors in 2015.

=== Public schools ===
- Clark County R-1 School District – Kahoka
  - Running Fox Elementary School (PK-05)
  - Black Hawk Elementary School (K-05)
  - Clark County Middle School (06-08)
  - Clark County High School (09-12)

=== Private schools ===
- Shiloh Christian School – Kahoka (03-12) – Nondenominational Christianity

=== Public libraries ===
- Northeast Missouri Library Service

== Communities ==
=== Cities ===
- Alexandria
- Kahoka (county seat)
- Revere
- Wayland
- Wyaconda

=== Villages ===
- Luray

=== Census-designated places ===
- Medill
- St. Francisville

=== Other unincorporated places ===
- Acasto
- Anson
- Antioch
- Ashton
- Athens
- Chambersburg
- Clark City
- Dumas
- Fairmont
- Gregory Landing
- Neeper
- Peaksville
- St. Patrick
- Union
- Waterloo
- Winchester

=== Townships (all inactive) ===
- Clay
- Des Moines
- Folker
- Grant
- Jackson
- Jefferson
- Lincoln
- Madison
- Sweet Home
- Union
- Vernon
- Washington
- Wyaconda

== Politics ==
=== Local ===
The Republican Party controls politics at the local level in Clark County. As of 2018, Republicans hold nine of fourteen of the elected positions in the county.

Clark County, Missouri

Elected countywide officials
Assessor	John Campbell	Republican
Circuit Clerk	Kimberly Smith	Republican
County Clerk	Kelly Waples	Republican
Collector	Michelle Allen	Republican
Commissioner (presiding)	Steven Krueger	Republican
Commissioner (district 1)	Timothy Harper	Republican
Commissioner (district 2)	Joseph Humes	Republican
Coroner	Edwin Wilson	Republican
Prosecuting Attorney	Lindsay Gravett	Republican
Public Administrator	Melissa Vigen	Democratic
Recorder	Melissa Bevans	Republican
Sheriff	Shawn Webster	Republican
Surveyor	Kevin Flood	Republican
Treasurer	Roberta McAfee	Republican

=== State ===
Past Gubernatorial Election Results
Year	Republican	Democratic	Third Parties
2024	80.10% 2,616	17.02% 556	2.88% 94
2020	79.09% 2,667	19.22% 648	1.69% 57
2016	62.34% 2,053	34.74% 1,144	2.92% 96
2012	40.78% 1,312	56.64% 1,822	2.58% 83
2008	51.33% 1,772	46.00% 1,588	1.67% 92
2004	66.98% 2,469	30.63% 1,129	2.38% 88
2000	46.47% 1,751	51.17% 1,928	2.36% 89
1996	29.87% 966	68.46% 2,214	1.67% 54

All of Clark County is included in Missouri's 4th District in the Missouri House of Representatives and is represented by Craig Redmon (R-Ewing).

Missouri House of Representatives — District 4 — Clark County
Party	Candidate	Votes	%	±%
Republican	Greg Sharpe			

Missouri House of Representatives — District 4 — Clark County (2014)
Party	Candidate	Votes	%	±%
Republican	Craig Redmon	1,794	100.00%	

Missouri House of Representatives — District 4 — Clark County (2012)
Party	Candidate	Votes	%	±%
Republican	Craig Redmon	2.582	100.00%	

All of Clark County is a part of Missouri's 18th District in the Missouri Senate and is currently represented by Cindy O'Laughlin (R-Shelbina).

Missouri Senate — District 18 — Clark County (2014)
Party	Candidate	Votes	%	±%
Republican	Brian Munzlinger	1,837	100.00%	

=== Federal ===
U.S. Senate — Missouri — Clark County (2016)
Party	Candidate	Votes	%	±%
Republican	Roy Blunt	2,037	62.16%	+22.17
Democratic	Jason Kander	1,059	32.32%	−23.90
Libertarian	Jonathan Dine	98	2.99%	−0.80
Green	Johnathan McFarland	40	1.22%	+1.22
Constitution	Fred Ryman	43	1.31%	+1.31

U.S. Senate — Missouri — Clark County (2012)
Party	Candidate	Votes	%	±%
Republican	Todd Akin	1.288	39.99%	
Democratic	Claire McCaskill	1,811	56.22%	
Libertarian	Jonathan Dine	122	3.79%	

All of Clark County is included in Missouri's 6th Congressional District and is currently represented by Sam Graves (R-Tarkio) in the U.S. House of Representatives.

U.S. House of Representatives — Missouri's 6th Congressional District — Clark County (2016)
Party	Candidate	Votes	%	±%
Republican	Sam Graves	2,413	75.24%	+3.79
Democratic	David M. Blackwell	673	20.99%	−4.49
Libertarian	Russ Lee Monchil	68	2.12%	−0.95
Green	Mike Diel	53	1.65%	+1.65

U.S. House of Representatives — Missouri’s 6th Congressional District — Clark County (2014)
Party	Candidate	Votes	%	±%
Republican	Sam Graves	1,464	71.45%	+13.75
Democratic	Bill Hedge	522	25.48%	−13.91
Libertarian	Russ Lee Monchil	63	3.07%	+0.16

U.S. House of Representatives — Missouri's 6th Congressional District — Clark County (2012)
Party	Candidate	Votes	%	±%
Republican	Sam Graves	1,746	57.70%	
Democratic	Kyle Yarber	1,192	39.39%	
Libertarian	Russ Lee Monchil	88	2.91%	

United States presidential election results for Clark County, Missouri
Year	Republican		Democratic		Third party(ies)	
Year	No.	%	No.	%	No.	%
1888	1,724	48.54%	1,791	50.42%	37	1.04%
1892	1,684	47.48%	1,807	50.94%	56	1.58%
1896	1,953	47.89%	2,107	51.67%	18	0.44%
1900	1,899	47.70%	2,021	50.77%	61	1.53%
1904	1,836	50.50%	1,724	47.41%	76	2.09%
1908	1,741	49.52%	1,737	49.40%	38	1.08%
1912	1,214	36.53%	1,586	47.73%	523	15.74%
1916	1,782	50.68%	1,692	48.12%	42	1.19%
1920	3,310	57.46%	2,383	41.36%	68	1.18%
1924	2,948	50.37%	2,770	47.33%	135	2.31%
1928	3,259	59.83%	2,170	39.84%	18	0.33%
1932	2,223	41.75%	3,072	57.70%	29	0.54%
1936	2,812	48.15%	3,003	51.42%	25	0.43%
1940	3,171	53.59%	2,728	46.10%	18	0.30%
1944	2,707	55.61%	2,155	44.27%	6	0.12%
1948	2,264	49.01%	2,352	50.92%	3	0.06%
1952	2,850	57.95%	2,045	41.58%	23	0.47%
1956	2,623	54.46%	2,193	45.54%	0	0.00%
1960	2,642	56.44%	2,039	43.56%	0	0.00%
1964	1,660	42.75%	2,223	57.25%	0	0.00%
1968	2,111	53.55%	1,489	37.77%	342	8.68%
1972	2,499	64.04%	1,403	35.96%	0	0.00%
1976	1,582	48.32%	1,679	51.28%	13	0.40%
1980	2,042	56.50%	1,494	41.34%	78	2.16%
1984	2,068	55.97%	1,627	44.03%	0	0.00%
1988	1,493	43.52%	1,925	56.11%	13	0.38%
1992	1,039	28.99%	1,815	50.64%	730	20.37%
1996	1,081	32.63%	1,749	52.79%	483	14.58%
2000	1,899	49.95%	1,812	47.66%	91	2.39%
2004	1,899	50.83%	1,794	48.02%	43	1.15%
2008	1,782	51.56%	1,572	45.49%	102	2.95%
2012	1,730	53.64%	1,398	43.35%	97	3.01%
2016	2,458	74.13%	724	21.83%	134	4.04%
2020	2,672	78.73%	678	19.98%	44	1.30%
2024	2,679	80.38%	628	18.84%	26	0.78%

== See also ==
- National Register of Historic Places listings in Clark County, Missouri
