= Somerset Township =

Somerset Township may refer to:

- Somerset Township, Jackson County, Illinois
- Somerset Township, Hillsdale County, Michigan
- Somerset Township, Steele County, Minnesota
- Somerset Township, Mercer County, Missouri
- Somerset Township, Belmont County, Ohio
- Somerset Township, Somerset County, Pennsylvania
- Somerset Township, Washington County, Pennsylvania

See also

- Somerset (disambiguation)
