= North Mercer School District =

School district in Missouri, U.S.

Address
- 22931 Main Street Mercer, Missouri, 64661; United States

District information
- Type: Public
- Grades: PreK–12
- Superintendent: Dan Owens
- Schools: 1

Students and staff
- Students: 170
- Teachers: 23.03
- Staff: 17.71
- Student–teacher ratio: 7.38

Other information
- Website: www.northmercer.k12.mo.us

The North Mercer School District, officially known as the North Mercer County R-III School District, is a public school district headquartered in Mercer, Missouri. The district operates a single PreK–12 school, North Mercer School, and serves the town of Mercer and a portion of nearby Ravanna.

== Administration ==
As of 2025, the district superintendent is Dan Owens, whose contract was extended by the Board of Education in 2020. The principal for all grade levels is Wes Guilkey, whose contract was also renewed in 2021.

== Academics ==
The district offers a full K–12 curriculum and participates in dual credit programs to support college readiness. In 1995, students from the Lineville-Clio Community School District in Iowa attended Spanish classes at North Mercer School as part of a cooperative arrangement.

== Performance ==
As of the 2024–2025 school year, the district serves approximately 156 students and maintains a student–teacher ratio of about 7:1, one of the lowest in the state. The district ranks in the top 20% of Missouri public school districts for academic performance, with math proficiency at 48% and reading proficiency at 56%, both above state averages.

== Athletics ==
In 2005, North Mercer entered into a cooperative agreement with the Princeton R-V School District for athletics. Under this arrangement, North Mercer hosts boys' softball for both districts, while Princeton hosts football.

== Facilities and Programs ==
The district offers a variety of extracurricular programs, including a summer after-school program and partnerships with local arts organizations such as the Children's Theater Workshop.

== Extent ==
The North Mercer School District covers the northeastern third of Mercer County, Missouri including the municipalities of Mercer and South Lineville, and part of the census-designated place Ravanna.

== See also ==
- List of school districts in Missouri
