= List of school districts in Missouri =

This is an alphabetical list of school districts in Missouri, sorted first by the state supervisors of instruction regions, the counties each region serves, and then alphabetically.

Many districts have the letters "C" or "R" in their name, followed by a numeral. These stand for "consolidated" (merged through consent of voters) and "reorganized" (merged by the state), respectively, with number indicating the historical order of the merger.

All school districts, except for one, in Missouri were independent governments as of 2022. As of 2022 the state had one public school system dependent on another layer of government; it runs the Normandy Schools Collaborative. The U.S. Census Bureau stated: "This is expected to be temporary, and the school district will revert to a fully local elected board by the end of 2024."

== History ==
In 1900 there were 10,499 school districts, the highest ever such number in the state.

In 2023 there were 518 school districts in the state.

== Region A: St. Louis Region ==
=== Jefferson County ===
- Crystal City 47 School District
- DeSoto 73 School District
- Dunklin R-V School District
- Festus R-VI School District
- Fox C-VI School District
- Grandview R-II School District
- Hillsboro R-III School District
- Jefferson County R-VII School District
- Northwest R-I School District
- Sunrise R-IX School District
- Windsor C-I School District

=== St. Charles County ===
- Francis Howell R-III School District
- Fort Zumwalt R-II School District
- Orchard Farm R-V School District
- St. Charles R-VI School District
- Wentzville R-IV School District

=== St. Louis City ===
- St. Louis City Public Schools

=== St. Louis County ===
- Affton School District
- Bayless School District
- Brentwood School District
- Clayton School District
- Ferguson-Florissant R-II School District
- Hancock Place School District
- Hazelwood School District
- Jennings School District
- Kirkwood R-7 School District
- Ladue School District
- Lindbergh School District
- Maplewood-Richmond Heights School District
- Mehlville R-IX School District
- Normandy School Collaborative
- Parkway C-II School District
- Pattonville R-III School District
- Ritenour School District
- Riverview Gardens School District
- Rockwood R-VI School District
- Special School District of St. Louis County
- University City School District
- Valley Park School District
- Webster Groves School District

== Region B: Kansas City Region ==
=== Clay County ===
- Excelsior Springs 40 School District
- Kearney R-1 School District
- Liberty 53 School District
- Missouri City 56 School District
- North Kansas City 74 School District
- Smithville R-II School District

=== Jackson County ===
- Blue Springs R-IV School District
- Center 58 School District
- Fort Osage R-1 School District
- Grain Valley R-V School District
- Grandview C-IV School District
- Hickman Mills C-1 School District
- Independence 30 School District
- Kansas City 33 School District
- Lee's Summit R-VII School District
- Lone Jack C-VI School District
- Oak Grove R-VI School District (also extends into Lafayette County)
- Raytown C-II School District

=== Platte County ===
- North Platte R-I School District (also extends into Buchanan County)
- Park Hill School District
- Platte County R-III School District
- West Platte R-II School District

== Region C: Southwest Region ==
=== Barry County ===
- Cassville R-IV School District
- Exeter R-VI School District
- Monett R-I School District (also extends into Lawrence County)
- Purdy R-II School District
- Shell Knob 78 School District
- Southwest R-V School District
- Wheaton R-III School District

=== Barton County ===
- Golden City R-III School District
- Lamar R-I School District
- Liberal R-II School District

=== Cedar County ===
- El Dorado Springs R-II School District
- Stockton R-1 School District

=== Christian County ===
- Billings R-IV School District (also extends into Stone County)
- Chadwick R-I School District
- Clever R-V School District (also extends into Stone County)
- Nixa Public Schools
- Ozark R-VI School District
- Sparta R-III School District
- Spokane R-VII School District

=== Dade County ===
- Dadeville R-II School District
- Everton R-III School District
- Greenfield R-IV School District
- Lockwood R-I School District

=== Dallas County ===
- Dallas R-I County School District

=== Douglas County ===
- Ava R-I School District (also extends into Christian, Ozark, and Wright counties)
- Plainview R-VIII School District
- Skyline R-II School District

=== Greene County ===
- Ash Grove R-IV School District
- Fair Grove R-X School District
- Logan-Rogersville R-VIII School District (also extends into Webster County)
- Republic R-III School District
- Springfield R-XII School District
- Strafford R-VI School District
- Walnut Grove R-V School District
- Willard R-II School District

=== Jasper County ===
- Avilla R-XIII School District
- Carl Junction R-I School District (also extends into Newton County)
- Carthage R-IX School District
- Jasper County R-V School District (also extends into Barton County)
- Joplin Schools
- Sarcoxie R-II School District
- Webb City R-VII School District

=== Laclede County ===
- Gasconade C-IV School District
- Laclede County C-V School District
- Laclede County R-I School District
- Lebanon R-III School District

=== Lawrence County ===
- Aurora R-VIII School District
- Marionville R-IX School District
- Miller R-II School District
- Mount Vernon R-V School District
- Pierce City R-VI School District
- Verona R-VII School District

=== McDonald County ===
- McDonald County R-I School District

=== Newton County ===
- Diamond R-IV School District
- East Newton County R-VI School District
- Neosho School District
- Seneca R-VII School District
- Westview C-VI School District

=== Ozark County ===
- Bakersfield R-IV School District (also extends into Howell County)
- Dora R-III School District (also extends into Douglas County)
- Gainesville School District
- Lutie R-VI School District
- Thornfield R-I School District

=== Polk County ===
- Bolivar R-I School District
- Fair Play R-II School District
- Halfway R-III School District
- Humansville R-IV School District
- Marion C. Early R-V School District
- Pleasant Hope R-VI School District

=== Stone County ===
- Blue Eye R-V School District
- Crane R-III School District (also extends into Barry County)
- Galena R-II School District
- Hurley R-I School District
- Reeds Spring R-IV School District

=== Taney County ===
- Bradleyville R-I School District (also extends into Christian, Douglas and Ozark counties)
- Branson R-IV School District
- Forsyth R-III School District
- Hollister R-V School District (also extends into Stone County)
- Kirbyville R-VI School District
- Mark Twain R-VIII School District
- Taneyville R-II School District

=== Vernon County ===
- Bronaugh R-VII School District
- Nevada R-V School District
- Northeast Vernon County R-I School District
- Sheldon R-VIII School District

=== Webster County ===
- Fordland R-III School District
- Marshfield R-I School District
- Niangua R-V School District
- Seymour R-II School District

=== Wright County ===
- Hartville R-II School District
- Manes R-V School District
- Mansfield R-IV School District
- Mountain Grove R-III School District
- Norwood R-I School District (also extends into Douglas County)

== Region D: Central Region ==
=== Audrain County ===
- Community R-VI School District (also extends into Montgomery and Ralls counties)
- Mexico 59 Public Schools
- Van-Far R-I School District

=== Boone County ===
- Centralia R-VI School District (also extends into Audrain and Monroe counties)
- Columbia 78 School District
- Hallsville R-IV School District
- Harrisburg R-VIII School District
- Southern Boone Co. R-I School District
- Sturgeon School District

=== Callaway County ===
- Fulton 58 School District
- New Bloomfield R-III School District
- North Callaway County R-I School District
- South Callaway R-II School District

=== Camden County ===
- Camdenton R-III School District (also extends into Dallas, Laclede and Morgan counties)
- Climax Springs R-IV School District (also extends into Benton, Hickory, and Morgan counties)
- Macks Creek R-V School District
- Stoutland R-II School District

=== Cole County ===
- Blair Oaks R-II School District
- Cole County R-I School District (also extends into Moniteau County)
- Cole County R-V School District (also extends into Miller County)
- Jefferson City Public Schools (also extends into Callaway County)

=== Cooper County ===
- Blackwater R-II School District (also extends into Saline County)
- Boonville R-I School District
- Cooper County R-IV School District
- Otterville R-VI School District
- Pilot Grove C-4 School District
- Prairie Home R-5 School District

=== Gasconade County ===
- Gasconade County R-I School District
- Gasconade County R-II School District

=== Howard County ===
- Fayette R-III School District
- Glasgow School District
- New Franklin R-1 School District

=== Lincoln County ===
- Elsberry R-II School District
- Silex R-I School District
- Troy R-III School District
- Winfield R-IV School District

=== Miller County ===
- Eldon R-1 School District
- Iberia R-V School District
- Miller County R-III School District
- School of the Osage School District
- St. Elizabeth R-IV School District

=== Moniteau County ===
- Clarksburg C-2 School District (also extends into Cooper County)
- High Point R-III School District
- Jamestown C-1 School District
- Moniteau County R-I School District
- Moniteau County R-V School District
- Tipton R-VI School District

=== Montgomery County ===
- Montgomery County R-II School District
- Wellsville Middletown R-I School District

=== Morgan County ===
- Morgan County R-I School District
- Morgan County R-II School District

=== Osage County ===
- Osage Co. R-I School District
- Osage Co. R-II School District
- Osage Co. R-III School District

=== Warren County ===
- Warren County R-III School District (also extends into Montgomery County)
- Wright City R-II School District

== Region E: Southeast Region ==
=== Bollinger County ===
- Leopold R-III School District
- Meadow Heights R-II School District
- Woodland R-IV School District
- Zalma R-V School District

=== Butler County ===
- Neelyville R-IV School District
- Poplar Bluff R-1 School District
- Twin Rivers R-X School District

=== Cape Girardeau County ===
- Cape Girardeau 63 School District
- Delta R-5 School District
- Jackson R-2 School District
- Nell Holcomb R-IV School District
- Oak Ridge R-VI School District

=== Carter County ===
- East Carter County R-II School District
- Van Buren R-1 School District

=== Dunklin County ===
- Campbell R-II School District
- Clarkton C-4 School District
- Holcomb R-III School District
- Kennett 39 School District
- Malden R-I School District
- Senath-Hornersville C-8 School District
- Southland C-9 School District

=== Madison County ===
- Fredericktown R-1 School District
- Marquand-Zion R-VI School District

=== Mississippi County ===
- Charleston R-I School District
- East Prairie R-II School District

=== New Madrid County ===
- Gideon 37 School District
- New Madrid County R-I School District
- Portageville School District
- Risco R-II School District

=== Pemiscot County ===
- Caruthersville 18 School District
- Cooter R-IV School District
- Delta C-7 School District
- Hayti R-II School District
- North Pemiscot County R-I School District
- Pemiscot County R-III School District
- Pemiscot County Special School District
- South Pemiscot Co. R-V School District

=== Perry County ===
- Altenburg 48 School District
- Perry County 32 School District

=== Ripley County ===
- Doniphan R-I School District
- Naylor R-II School District
- Ripley Co. R-IV School District
- Ripley County R-III School District

=== St. Francois County ===
- Bismarck R-V School District
- Central R-III School District (also extends into Ste. Genevieve County)
- Farmington R-VII School District
- North Saint Francois County R-1 School District
- West Saint Francois County R-IV School District (also extends into Washington County)

=== Ste. Genevieve County ===
- Ste. Genevieve County R-II School District

=== Scott County ===
- Chaffee R-II School District
- Kelso C-7 School District
- Oran R-III School District
- Scott City R-I School District
- Scott Co. R-IV School District
- Scott County Central School District
- Sikeston R-6 School District

=== Stoddard County ===
- Advance R-IV School District (also extends into Bollinger County)
- Bell City R-II School District
- Bernie R-XIII School District (also extends into Dunklin County)
- Bloomfield R-XIV School District
- Dexter R-XI School District
- Puxico R-VIII School District
- Richland R-I School District

=== Wayne County ===
- Clearwater R-I School District (also extends into Madison and Reynolds counties)
- Greenville R-II School District

== Region F: West Central Region ==
=== Bates County ===
- Adrian R-II School District
- Ballard R-II School District
- Butler R-V School District
- Hudson R-IX School District
- Hume R-VIII School District
- Miami R-I School District
- Rich Hill R-IV School District

=== Benton County ===
- Cole Camp R-I School District (also extends into Pettis County)
- Lincoln R-II School District
- Warsaw R-IX School District

=== Carroll County ===
- Bosworth R-V School District
- Carrollton R-VII School District
- Hale R-I School District
- Norborne R-VIII School District
- Tina-Avalon R-II School District

=== Cass County ===
- Archie RV School District (Partially extends into Bates County)
- Belton 124 School District
- Cass Midway R-1 School District
- Drexel R-IV School District
- East Lynne 40 School District
- Harrisonville R-IX School District
- Pleasant Hill R-III School District
- Raymore-Peculiar R-II School District
- Sherwood Cass R-VIII School District
- Strasburg C-III School District

=== Henry County ===
- Calhoun R-VIII School District
- Clinton School District
- Davis R-XII School District
- Henry County R-I School District
- Leesville R-IX School District
- Montrose R-XIV School District
- Shawnee R-III School District

=== Hickory County ===
- Hermitage R-IV School District
- Hickory County R-I School District
- Weaubleau R-III School District
- Wheatland R-II School District

=== Johnson County ===
- Chilhowee R-IV School District (also extends into Henry County)
- Holden R-III School District
- Johnson Co. R-VII School District
- Kingsville R-I School District
- Knob Noster R-VIII School District
- Leeton R-X School District
- Warrensburg R-VI School District

=== Lafayette County ===
- Concordia R-II School District (also extends into Johnson County)
- Lafayette County C-1 School District
- Lexington R-V School District
- Odessa R-VII School District (also extends into Johnson County)
- Santa Fe R-X School District
- Wellington-Napoleon R-IX School District

=== Pettis County ===
- Green Ridge R-VIII School District
- La Monte R-IV School District
- Pettis County R-V School District
- Pettis County R-XII School District
- Sedalia 200 School District
- Smithton R-VI School District

=== Ray County ===
- Hardin-Central C-II School District
- Lawson R-XIV School District
- Orrick R-XI School District
- Richmond R-XVI School District

=== St. Clair County ===
- Appleton City R-II School District
- Lakeland R-III School District
- Osceola School District
- Roscoe C-1 School District

=== Saline County ===
- Gilliam C-IV School District
- Hardeman R-X School District
- Malta Bend R-V School District
- Marshall School District
- Miami R-I Elem. School District
- Orearville R-IV School District
- Slater School District
- Sweet Springs R-VII School District

== Region G: South Central Region ==
=== Crawford County ===
- Crawford County R-I School District (also extends into Washington County)
- Crawford County R-II School District
- Steelville R-III School District

=== Dent County ===
- Dent-Phelps R-III School District
- Green Forest R-II School District
- North Wood R-IV School District
- Oak Hill R-I School District
- Salem R-80 School District

=== Franklin County ===
- Franklin Co. R-II School District
- Lonedell R-XIV School District
- Meramec Valley R-III School District (also extends into St. Louis County)
- New Haven School District
- Spring Bluff R-XV School District
- St. Clair R-XIII School District
- Strain Japan R-16 School District
- Sullivan School District (also extends into Crawford County)
- Union R-XI School District
- Washington School District (also extends into St. Charles and Warren counties)

=== Howell County ===
- Fairview R-XI School District
- Glenwood R-VIII School District
- Howell Valley R-I School District
- Junction Hill C-12 School District
- Mountain View-Birch Tree R-III School District
- Richards R-V School District
- West Plains R-7 School District
- Willow Springs R-IV School District

=== Iron County ===
- Arcadia Valley R-II School District (also extends into Madison County)
- Belleview R-III School District
- Iron County C-4 School District (also extend into Crawford and Washington counties)
- South Iron R-I School District

=== Maries County ===
- Maries County R-I School District
- Maries County R-II School District

=== Oregon County ===
- Alton R-IV School District
- Couch R-I School District
- Oregon-Howell R-III School District
- Thayer R-II School District

=== Phelps County ===
- Newburg R-2 School District
- Phelps County R-3 School District (also extends into Texas County)
- Rolla 31 Public Schools
- Saint James R-1 School District (also extends into Maries County)

=== Pulaski County ===
- Crocker R-II School District
- Dixon R-I School District (also extends into Maries County)
- Laquey R-V School District
- Richland R-IV School District
- Swedeborg R-III School District
- Waynesville R-VI School District

=== Reynolds County ===
- Bunker R-III School District (Dent, Reynolds and Shannon counties)
- Centerville R-I School District
- Lesterville R-IV School District
- Southern Reynolds Co R-II School District

=== Shannon County ===
- Eminence R-I School District
- Winona R-III School District

=== Texas County ===
- Cabool R-IV School District (also extends into Douglas County)
- Houston R-I School District
- Licking R-VIII School District
- Plato R-V School District (also extends into Laclede, Pulaski, and Wright counties)
- Raymondville R-VII School District
- Success School District R-VI
- Summersville R-II School District

=== Washington County ===
- Kingston K-14 School District (also extends into Jefferson County)
- Potosi R-3 School District
- Richwoods R-VII School District
- Valley R-VI School District

== Region H: Northwest Region ==
=== Andrew County ===
- Avenue City R-IX School District
- North Andrew County R-VI School District
- Savannah R-III School District

=== Atchison County ===
- Fairfax R-III School District
- Rock Port R-II School District
- Tarkio R-I School District

=== Buchanan County ===
- Buchanan County R-IV School District
- East Buchanan County C-1 School District
- Mid-Buchanan County R-V School District
- St. Joseph School District

=== Caldwell County ===
- Braymer C-4 School District (also extends into Carroll, Ray and Livingston counties)
- Breckenridge R-I School District (also extends into Daviess and Livingston counties)
- Cowgill R-VI School District
- Hamilton R-II School District
- Kingston 42 School District
- Mirabile C-1 School District
- New York R-IV School District
- Polo R-VII School District

=== Clinton County ===
- Cameron R-I School District (also extends into Caldwell, Davies and Dekalb counties)
- Clinton County R-III School District (also extends into Clay County)
- Lathrop R-II School District

=== Daviess County ===
- Gallatin R-V School District
- North Daviess R-III School District
- Pattonsburg R-II School District
- Tri-County R-VII School District
- Winston R-VI School District

=== DeKalb County ===
- Maysville R-I School District
- Osborn R-0 School District
- Stewartsville C-2 School District
- Union Star R-II School District

=== Gentry County ===
- Albany R-III School District
- King City R-I School District
- Stanberry R-II School District

=== Grundy County ===
- Grundy County R-V School District
- Laredo R-VII School District
- Pleasant View R-VI School District
- Spickard R-II School District
- Trenton R-IX School District

=== Harrison County ===
- Cainsville R-I School District (also extends into Mercer County)
- Gilman City R-IV School District
- North Harrison R-III School District
- Ridgeway R-V School District
- South Harrison Co. R-II School District

=== Holt County ===
- Craig R-III School District
- Mound City R-II School District
- South Holt Co. R-I School District

=== Livingston County ===
- Chillicothe R-II School District
- Livingston County R-III School District
- Southwest Livingston County R-I School District

=== Mercer County ===
- North Mercer County R-III School District
- Princeton R-V School District

=== Nodaway County ===
- Jefferson C-123 School District
- Maryville R-II School District
- Nodaway-Holt R-VII School District
- North Nodaway County R-VI School District
- Northeast Nodaway County R-V School District
- South Nodaway Co. R-IV School District
- West Nodaway County R-I School District

=== Worth County ===
- Worth County R-III School District

== Region I: Northeast Region ==
=== Adair County ===
- Adair County R-I School District
- Adair County R-II School District (also extends into Knox County)
- Kirksville R-III School District

=== Chariton County ===
- Brunswick R-II School District (also extends into Saline County)
- Keytesville R-III School District
- Northwestern R-I School District
- Salisbury R-IV School District

=== Clark County ===
- Clark County R-1 School District

=== Knox County ===
- Knox Co. R-I School District

=== Lewis County ===
- Canton R-V School District
- Lewis County C-1 School District

=== Linn County ===
- Brookfield R-III School District (also extends into Chariton County)
- Bucklin R-II School District (also extends into Macon County)
- Linn County R-I School District (also extends into Sullivan County)
- Marceline R-V School District
- Meadville R-IV School District

=== Macon County ===
- Atlanta C-III School District (also extends into Shelby County)
- Bevier C-IV School District
- Callao C-VIII School District
- La Plata R-II School District
- Macon County R-I School District
- Macon County R-IV School District

=== Marion County ===
- Hannibal 60 School District
- Marion County R-II School District
- Palmyra R-1 School District

=== Monroe County ===
- Holliday C-II School District
- Madison C-III School District
- Middle Grove C-I School District
- Monroe City R-I School District
- Paris R-II School District

=== Pike County ===
- Boncl R-X School District
- Bowling Green R-I School District (also extends into Ralls County)
- Louisiana R-II School District
- Pike County R-III School District

=== Putnam County ===
- Putnam County R-I School District

=== Ralls County ===
- Ralls County R-II School District

=== Randolph County ===
- Higbee R-VIII School District
- Moberly School District
- Northeast Randolph County R-IV School District
- Renick R-V School District
- Westran R-I School District

=== Schuyler County ===
- Schuyler County R-I School District

=== Scotland County ===
- Scotland Co. R-I School District

=== Shelby County ===
- North Shelby School District
- Shelby County R-IV School District

=== Sullivan County ===
- Green City R-I School District
- Milan C-II School District
- Newtown-Harris R-III School District
