= Half Rock, Missouri =

Unincorporated community in Missouri

Coordinates: 40°16′23″N 93°26′09″W

Half Rock is an unincorporated community in Mercer County, in the U.S. state of Missouri.

== History ==
A post office called Half Rock was established in 1867 and remained in operation until 1900. According to tradition, the community was derisively so named on account of the quality of the coffee at a nearby store (i.e. the coffee was "half rock".) The community was never incorporated.
