= Ravanna =

Ravanna may refer to:

- Ravanna, Missouri
- Ravanna, Kansas
- Ravanna (film), a 2000 Tollywood action film
- Ravana, a ten-headed demon king in the Ramayana
