= Marion Township, Mercer County, Missouri =

Township in Mercer County, Missouri, U.S.

Coordinates: 40.50°N 93.53°W

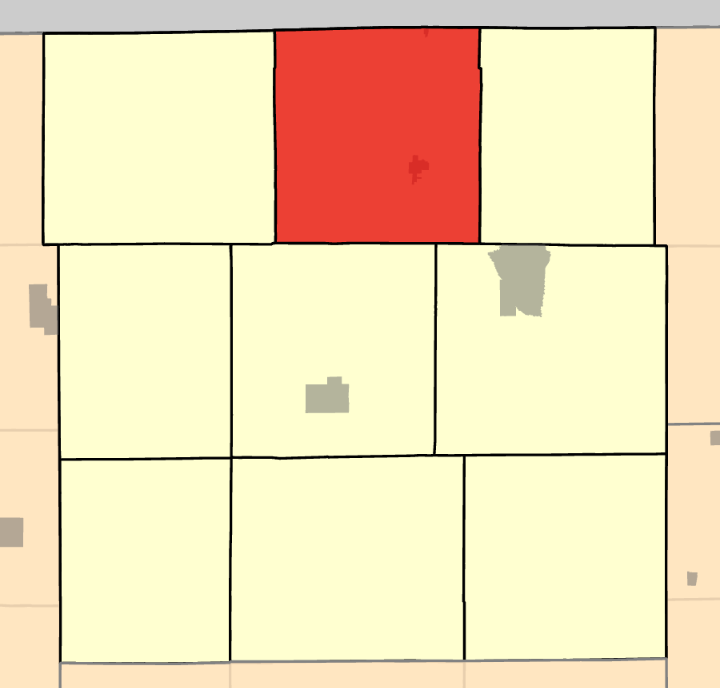

Marion Township is a township in Mercer County, in the U.S. state of Missouri. The city of Mercer is located in the center of the township.

The establishment date of Marion Township is unknown. The city of Mercer was previously known as Marion before it was known that there was another place named Marion, it is likely the township was named for the same reason as the city.

== Transportation ==
The following highways travel through the township:

- U.S. Route 65
- Route BB
- Route K
- Route M
