= Lindley Township, Mercer County, Missouri =

Township in Mercer County, Missouri, U.S.

Coordinates: 40.5253°N 93.6986°W

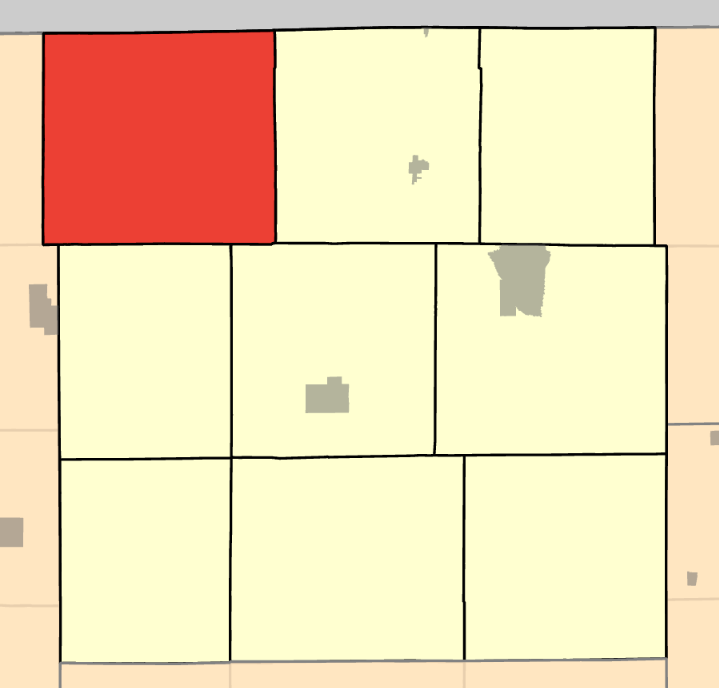

Lindley Township is a township in Mercer County, in the U.S. state of Missouri.

Lindley Township was established in 1856 (170 years ago), and most likely was named after James Johnson Lindley, a state legislator.

== Transportation ==
The following highways travel through the township:

- Route B
- Route K
- Route P
- Route T
- Route V
- Route WW
