= Cleopatra, Missouri =

Unincorporated community in Missouri, U.S.

Coordinates: 40°32′55″N 93°24′16″W

Cleopatra is an unincorporated community in Mercer County, in the U.S. state of Missouri.

== History ==
Cleopatra was originally called Somerset, and under the latter name was platted in 1856. A post office called Cleopatra was established in 1861, and remained in operation until 1905.
