= Medicine Township, Mercer County, Missouri =

Township in Mercer County, Missouri, U.S.

Coordinates: 40°19′15″N 93°25′52″W

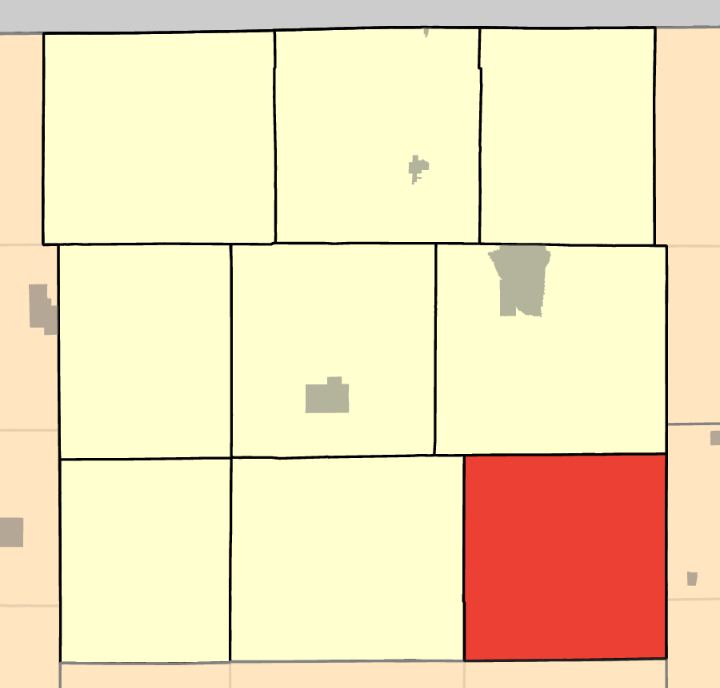

Medicine Township is a township in Mercer County, in the U.S. state of Missouri.

Medicine Township was established in 1848, and most likely took its name from a creek of the same name within its borders.

== Transportation ==
The following highways travel through the township:

- Route C
- Route E
- Route J
- Route JJ
- Route NN
