= 1936 United States presidential election in Missouri =

- November 3, 1936

Nominee	Franklin D. Roosevelt	Alf Landon
Party	Democratic	Republican
Home state	New York	Kansas
Running mate	John Nance Garner	Frank Knox
Electoral vote	15	0
Popular vote	1,111,043	697,891
Percentage	60.76%	38.16%
County results
Roosevelt
40–50%
50–60%
60–70%
70–80%
80–90%
Landon
40–50%
50–60%
60–70%
70–80%
President before election
Franklin D. Roosevelt
Democratic
Elected President
Franklin D. Roosevelt
Democratic

The 1936 United States presidential election in Missouri took place on November 3, 1936, as part of the 1936 United States presidential election. Voters chose 15 representatives, or electors, to the Electoral College, who voted for president and vice president.

Missouri was won by incumbent President Franklin D. Roosevelt (D–New York), running with Vice President John Nance Garner, with 60.76 percent of the popular vote, against Governor Alf Landon (R–Kansas), running with Frank Knox, with 38.16 percent of the popular vote.

== Results ==
1936 United States presidential election in Missouri
Party	Candidate	Votes	%
Democratic	Franklin D. Roosevelt (inc.)	1,111,043	60.76%
Republican	Alf Landon	697,891	38.16%
Union	William Lemke	14,630	0.80%
Socialist	Norman Thomas	3,454	0.19%
Prohibition	D. Leigh Colvin	908	0.05%
Communist	Earl R. Browder	417	0.02%
Socialist Labor	John W. Aiken	292	0.02%
Total votes		1,828,635	100%

=== Results by county ===
1936 United States presidential election in Missouri by county
County	Franklin D. Roosevelt Democratic		Alf Landon Republican		William Lemke Union		Norman Thomas Socialist		Various candidates Other parties		Margin		Total votes cast
County	#	%	#	%	#	%	#	%	#	%	#	%	Total votes cast
Adair	5,315	52.48%	4,685	46.26%	71	0.70%	37	0.37%	19	0.19%	630	6.22%	10,127
Andrew	3,702	48.12%	3,987	51.83%	2	0.03%	2	0.03%	0	0.00%	-285	-3.70%	7,693
Atchison	3,452	53.08%	3,044	46.81%	3	0.05%	2	0.03%	2	0.03%	408	6.27%	6,503
Audrain	7,455	74.59%	2,508	25.10%	21	0.21%	4	0.04%	6	0.06%	4,947	49.50%	9,994
Barry	5,744	49.10%	5,906	50.48%	14	0.12%	24	0.21%	11	0.09%	-162	-1.38%	11,699
Barton	4,048	55.84%	3,164	43.65%	14	0.19%	15	0.21%	8	0.11%	884	12.19%	7,249
Bates	5,681	52.71%	5,022	46.60%	59	0.55%	4	0.04%	11	0.10%	659	6.11%	10,777
Benton	1,950	36.48%	3,375	63.13%	12	0.22%	3	0.06%	6	0.11%	-1,425	-26.66%	5,346
Bollinger	2,816	47.98%	2,988	50.91%	59	1.01%	5	0.09%	1	0.02%	-172	-2.93%	5,869
Boone	11,241	75.31%	3,624	24.28%	11	0.07%	36	0.24%	14	0.09%	7,617	51.03%	14,926
Buchanan	28,825	64.15%	15,912	35.41%	161	0.36%	23	0.05%	12	0.03%	12,913	28.74%	44,933
Butler	6,234	49.35%	6,355	50.31%	2	0.02%	27	0.21%	13	0.10%	-121	-0.96%	12,631
Caldwell	3,014	44.24%	3,792	55.66%	2	0.03%	3	0.04%	2	0.03%	-778	-11.42%	6,813
Callaway	7,160	69.56%	3,112	30.23%	14	0.14%	3	0.03%	4	0.04%	4,048	39.33%	10,293
Camden	1,908	45.48%	2,281	54.37%	1	0.02%	1	0.02%	4	0.10%	-373	-8.89%	4,195
Cape Girardeau	8,892	54.45%	7,374	45.16%	29	0.18%	24	0.15%	11	0.07%	1,518	9.30%	16,330
Carroll	5,141	48.48%	5,432	51.22%	25	0.24%	3	0.03%	4	0.04%	-291	-2.74%	10,605
Carter	1,590	59.13%	1,073	39.90%	7	0.26%	17	0.63%	2	0.07%	517	19.23%	2,689
Cass	5,731	58.17%	4,070	41.31%	13	0.13%	27	0.27%	12	0.12%	1,661	16.86%	9,853
Cedar	2,443	40.64%	3,535	58.80%	18	0.30%	9	0.15%	7	0.12%	-1,092	-18.16%	6,012
Chariton	5,490	61.29%	3,433	38.33%	25	0.28%	3	0.03%	6	0.07%	2,057	22.97%	8,957
Christian	2,462	37.87%	4,022	61.87%	4	0.06%	10	0.15%	3	0.05%	-1,560	-24.00%	6,501
Clark	3,003	51.42%	2,812	48.15%	15	0.26%	5	0.09%	5	0.09%	191	3.27%	5,840
Clay	9,535	67.70%	4,491	31.89%	35	0.25%	7	0.05%	16	0.11%	5,044	35.81%	14,084
Clinton	4,166	61.93%	2,512	37.34%	37	0.55%	4	0.06%	8	0.12%	1,654	24.59%	6,727
Cole	8,831	58.46%	6,180	40.91%	81	0.54%	11	0.07%	3	0.02%	2,651	17.55%	15,106
Cooper	5,188	50.88%	4,980	48.84%	16	0.16%	5	0.05%	8	0.08%	208	2.04%	10,197
Crawford	2,879	48.30%	3,041	51.01%	26	0.44%	11	0.18%	4	0.07%	-162	-2.72%	5,961
Dade	2,312	40.78%	3,326	58.67%	12	0.21%	10	0.18%	9	0.16%	-1,014	-17.89%	5,669
Dallas	1,749	36.23%	3,066	63.50%	2	0.04%	9	0.19%	2	0.04%	-1,317	-27.28%	4,828
Daviess	3,953	50.03%	3,924	49.66%	14	0.18%	5	0.06%	6	0.08%	29	0.37%	7,902
DeKalb	2,680	48.11%	2,872	51.56%	10	0.18%	1	0.02%	7	0.13%	-192	-3.45%	5,570
Dent	3,168	57.45%	2,313	41.95%	3	0.05%	26	0.47%	4	0.07%	855	15.51%	5,514
Douglas	2,118	34.23%	4,031	65.15%	11	0.18%	20	0.32%	7	0.11%	-1,913	-30.92%	6,187
Dunklin	10,233	72.75%	3,775	26.84%	39	0.28%	12	0.09%	7	0.05%	6,458	45.91%	14,066
Franklin	7,565	47.52%	7,708	48.42%	602	3.78%	33	0.21%	12	0.08%	-143	-0.90%	15,920
Gasconade	1,492	26.10%	4,202	73.51%	10	0.17%	7	0.12%	5	0.09%	-2,710	-47.41%	5,716
Gentry	4,173	57.12%	3,115	42.64%	10	0.14%	4	0.05%	4	0.05%	1,058	14.48%	7,306
Greene	21,489	55.23%	17,298	44.46%	34	0.09%	59	0.15%	26	0.07%	4,191	10.77%	38,906
Grundy	4,187	47.78%	4,521	51.59%	28	0.32%	19	0.22%	8	0.09%	-334	-3.81%	8,763
Harrison	3,942	44.53%	4,888	55.22%	8	0.09%	5	0.06%	9	0.10%	-946	-10.69%	8,852
Henry	7,145	59.00%	4,927	40.68%	12	0.10%	19	0.16%	8	0.07%	2,218	18.31%	12,111
Hickory	910	28.03%	2,329	71.73%	1	0.03%	3	0.09%	4	0.12%	-1,419	-43.70%	3,247
Holt	3,076	47.33%	3,409	52.45%	5	0.08%	3	0.05%	6	0.09%	-333	-5.12%	6,499
Howard	5,326	75.10%	1,745	24.61%	9	0.13%	6	0.08%	6	0.08%	3,581	50.49%	7,092
Howell	4,725	46.95%	5,297	52.63%	27	0.27%	7	0.07%	8	0.08%	-572	-5.68%	10,064
Iron	2,413	59.89%	1,605	39.84%	2	0.05%	1	0.02%	8	0.20%	808	20.05%	4,029
Jackson	215,120	72.84%	79,119	26.79%	830	0.28%	155	0.05%	95	0.03%	136,001	46.05%	295,319
Jasper	19,822	57.31%	14,440	41.75%	178	0.51%	96	0.28%	49	0.14%	5,382	15.56%	34,585
Jefferson	9,158	61.16%	5,575	37.23%	208	1.39%	18	0.12%	15	0.10%	3,583	23.93%	14,974
Johnson	6,294	51.96%	5,797	47.86%	11	0.09%	7	0.06%	4	0.03%	497	4.10%	12,113
Knox	3,030	58.35%	2,134	41.09%	23	0.44%	1	0.02%	5	0.10%	896	17.25%	5,193
Laclede	3,691	46.27%	4,258	53.38%	10	0.13%	10	0.13%	8	0.10%	-567	-7.11%	7,977
Lafayette	7,275	48.95%	7,535	50.70%	13	0.09%	29	0.20%	9	0.06%	-260	-1.75%	14,861
Lawrence	6,184	49.71%	6,185	49.72%	36	0.29%	10	0.08%	24	0.19%	-1	-0.01%	12,439
Lewis	3,859	65.37%	1,994	33.78%	27	0.46%	18	0.30%	5	0.08%	1,865	31.59%	5,903
Lincoln	4,625	66.80%	2,258	32.61%	37	0.53%	2	0.03%	2	0.03%	2,367	34.19%	6,924
Linn	6,744	56.60%	5,118	42.95%	40	0.34%	9	0.08%	4	0.03%	1,626	13.65%	11,915
Livingston	5,226	52.55%	4,678	47.04%	28	0.28%	8	0.08%	4	0.04%	548	5.51%	9,944
Macon	6,417	56.98%	4,808	42.69%	21	0.19%	10	0.09%	6	0.05%	1,609	14.29%	11,262
Madison	2,323	53.50%	2,013	46.36%	1	0.02%	4	0.09%	1	0.02%	310	7.14%	4,342
Maries	2,414	64.55%	1,306	34.92%	12	0.32%	5	0.13%	3	0.08%	1,108	29.63%	3,740
Marion	11,068	70.29%	4,628	29.39%	15	0.10%	16	0.10%	20	0.13%	6,440	40.90%	15,747
McDonald	3,503	51.37%	3,312	48.57%	1	0.01%	2	0.03%	1	0.01%	191	2.80%	6,819
Mercer	1,834	39.83%	2,757	59.87%	5	0.11%	7	0.15%	2	0.04%	-923	-20.04%	4,605
Miller	3,436	48.49%	3,607	50.90%	29	0.41%	8	0.11%	6	0.08%	-171	-2.41%	7,086
Mississippi	4,160	61.75%	2,552	37.88%	4	0.06%	8	0.12%	13	0.19%	1,608	23.87%	6,737
Moniteau	3,210	49.64%	3,238	50.08%	15	0.23%	2	0.03%	1	0.02%	-28	-0.43%	6,466
Monroe	6,376	86.87%	939	12.79%	16	0.22%	5	0.07%	4	0.05%	5,437	74.07%	7,340
Montgomery	3,458	49.85%	3,468	49.99%	2	0.03%	4	0.06%	5	0.07%	-10	-0.14%	6,937
Morgan	2,585	46.19%	2,993	53.48%	6	0.11%	10	0.18%	2	0.04%	-408	-7.29%	5,596
New Madrid	7,791	60.53%	5,056	39.28%	5	0.04%	8	0.06%	12	0.09%	2,735	21.25%	12,872
Newton	6,929	51.52%	6,437	47.87%	34	0.25%	30	0.22%	18	0.13%	492	3.66%	13,448
Nodaway	7,499	55.97%	5,817	43.41%	63	0.47%	12	0.09%	8	0.06%	1,682	12.55%	13,399
Oregon	3,504	70.50%	1,461	29.40%	2	0.04%	2	0.04%	1	0.02%	2,043	41.11%	4,970
Osage	3,995	57.91%	2,836	41.11%	54	0.78%	12	0.17%	2	0.03%	1,159	16.80%	6,899
Ozark	1,359	31.21%	2,981	68.47%	1	0.02%	9	0.21%	4	0.09%	-1,622	-37.25%	4,354
Pemiscot	8,171	66.30%	4,139	33.58%	2	0.02%	5	0.04%	7	0.06%	4,032	32.72%	12,324
Perry	3,098	46.90%	3,382	51.20%	118	1.79%	5	0.08%	3	0.05%	-284	-4.30%	6,606
Pettis	9,265	55.08%	7,435	44.20%	98	0.58%	9	0.05%	14	0.08%	1,830	10.88%	16,821
Phelps	4,658	63.11%	2,690	36.44%	9	0.12%	10	0.14%	14	0.19%	1,968	26.66%	7,381
Pike	5,898	66.82%	2,871	32.53%	25	0.28%	23	0.26%	10	0.11%	3,027	34.29%	8,827
Platte	4,884	72.99%	1,787	26.71%	9	0.13%	6	0.09%	5	0.07%	3,097	46.29%	6,691
Polk	3,899	43.09%	5,126	56.65%	7	0.08%	9	0.10%	7	0.08%	-1,227	-13.56%	9,048
Pulaski	2,886	56.86%	2,177	42.89%	3	0.06%	5	0.10%	5	0.10%	709	13.97%	5,076
Putnam	1,902	35.21%	3,458	64.01%	5	0.09%	28	0.52%	9	0.17%	-1,556	-28.80%	5,402
Ralls	3,822	78.24%	1,051	21.51%	4	0.08%	7	0.14%	1	0.02%	2,771	56.72%	4,885
Randolph	9,733	77.92%	2,723	21.80%	22	0.18%	6	0.05%	7	0.06%	7,010	56.12%	12,491
Ray	6,300	69.05%	2,805	30.74%	8	0.09%	9	0.10%	2	0.02%	3,495	38.31%	9,124
Reynolds	2,476	72.91%	915	26.94%	5	0.15%	0	0.00%	0	0.00%	1,561	45.97%	3,396
Ripley	2,466	56.08%	1,911	43.46%	4	0.09%	14	0.32%	2	0.05%	555	12.62%	4,397
Saint Charles	5,903	48.91%	5,156	42.72%	901	7.47%	100	0.83%	8	0.07%	747	6.19%	12,068
Saint Clair	3,302	49.40%	3,351	50.13%	16	0.24%	11	0.16%	4	0.06%	-49	-0.73%	6,684
Saint Francois	7,876	51.77%	7,271	47.79%	34	0.22%	21	0.14%	11	0.07%	605	3.98%	15,213
Saint Louis County	63,226	56.40%	45,541	40.63%	2,615	2.33%	615	0.55%	103	0.09%	17,685	15.78%	112,100
Saint Louis City	260,063	65.54%	127,887	32.23%	7,037	1.77%	1,268	0.32%	575	0.14%	132,176	33.31%	396,830
Sainte Genevieve	2,446	58.49%	1,664	39.79%	65	1.55%	7	0.17%	0	0.00%	782	18.70%	4,182
Saline	8,622	58.35%	6,108	41.34%	17	0.12%	9	0.06%	20	0.14%	2,514	17.01%	14,776
Schuyler	2,173	59.88%	1,447	39.87%	7	0.19%	1	0.03%	1	0.03%	726	20.01%	3,629
Scotland	2,768	58.01%	1,940	40.65%	48	1.01%	8	0.17%	8	0.17%	828	17.35%	4,772
Scott	7,763	70.95%	3,126	28.57%	35	0.32%	10	0.09%	7	0.06%	4,637	42.38%	10,941
Shannon	3,069	70.57%	1,225	28.17%	8	0.18%	44	1.01%	3	0.07%	1,844	42.40%	4,349
Shelby	4,367	71.57%	1,697	27.81%	28	0.46%	2	0.03%	8	0.13%	2,670	43.76%	6,102
Stoddard	6,608	57.51%	4,828	42.02%	6	0.05%	34	0.30%	15	0.13%	1,780	15.49%	11,491
Stone	1,366	28.79%	3,366	70.94%	3	0.06%	6	0.13%	4	0.08%	-2,000	-42.15%	4,745
Sullivan	3,986	49.67%	4,019	50.08%	14	0.17%	3	0.04%	3	0.04%	-33	-0.41%	8,025
Taney	1,710	37.50%	2,827	62.00%	15	0.33%	7	0.15%	1	0.02%	-1,117	-24.50%	4,560
Texas	4,718	53.11%	4,132	46.51%	5	0.06%	18	0.20%	11	0.12%	586	6.60%	8,884
Vernon	6,872	59.87%	4,546	39.61%	40	0.35%	10	0.09%	10	0.09%	2,326	20.26%	11,478
Warren	1,277	32.40%	2,639	66.96%	9	0.23%	10	0.25%	6	0.15%	-1,362	-34.56%	3,941
Washington	2,942	49.85%	2,909	49.29%	23	0.39%	17	0.29%	11	0.19%	33	0.56%	5,902
Wayne	3,235	56.31%	2,494	43.41%	3	0.05%	6	0.10%	7	0.12%	741	12.90%	5,745
Webster	3,612	44.58%	4,469	55.16%	8	0.10%	1	0.01%	12	0.15%	-857	-10.58%	8,102
Worth	1,944	54.67%	1,581	44.46%	27	0.76%	2	0.06%	2	0.06%	363	10.21%	3,556
Wright	3,296	40.32%	4,837	59.18%	9	0.11%	14	0.17%	18	0.22%	-1,541	-18.85%	8,174
Totals	1,111,043	60.76%	697,891	38.16%	14,630	0.80%	3,454	0.19%	1,617	0.09%	413,152	22.59%	1,828,635

==== Counties that flipped from Democratic to Republican ====
- Andrew
- Barry
- Benton
- Bollinger
- Butler
- Caldwell
- Camden
- Carroll
- Cedar
- Christian
- Crawford
- Dallas
- DeKalb
- Franklin
- Harrison
- Holt
- Howell
- Laclede
- Lafayette
- Lawrence
- Mercer
- Miller
- Moniteau
- Montgomery
- Morgan
- Perry
- Polk
- St. Clair
- Stone
- Sullivan
- Webster
- Wright

== See also ==
- United States presidential elections in Missouri
