= Washington Township, Mercer County, Missouri =

Township in Mercer County, Missouri, U.S.

Coordinates: 40.3133°N 93.5794°W

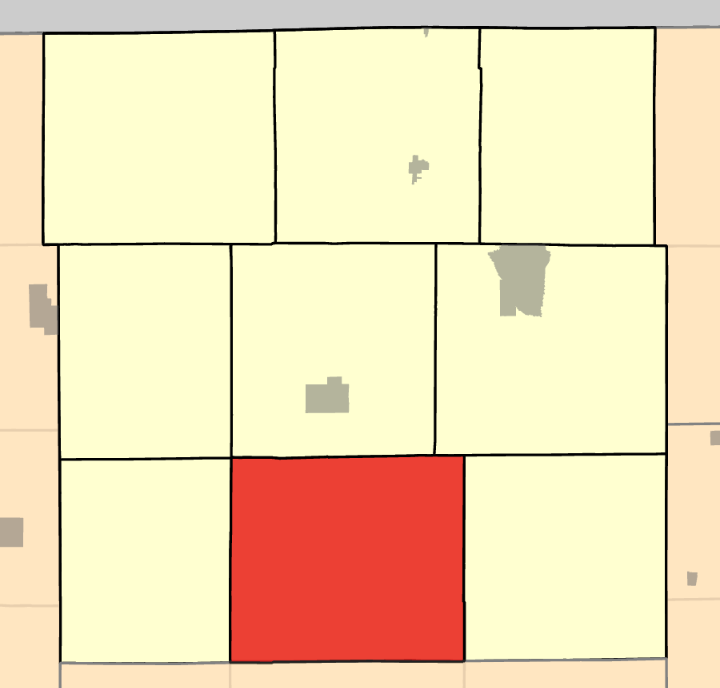

Washington Township is a township in Mercer County, in the U.S. state of Missouri.

Washington Township was established in 1843.

== Transportation ==
The following highways travel through the township:

- U.S. Route 65
- Route D
- Route E
- Route JJ
- Route U
- Route Y
