= 1916 United States presidential election in Missouri =

- November 7, 1916

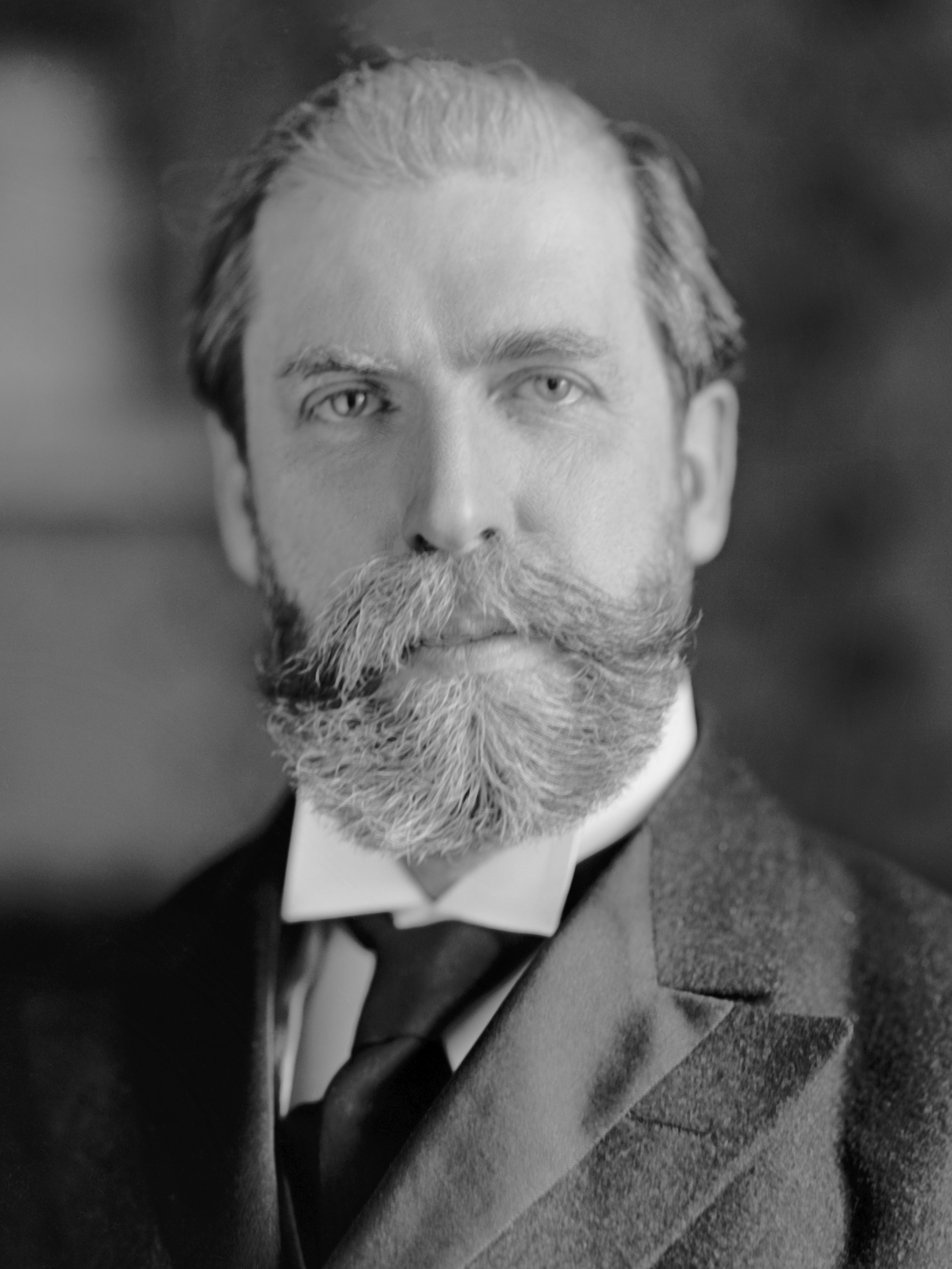
| Nominee | Woodrow Wilson | Charles Evans Hughes |
| Party | Democratic | Republican |
| Home state | New Jersey | New York |
| Running mate | Thomas R. Marshall | Charles W. Fairbanks |
| Electoral vote | 18 | 0 |
| Popular vote | 398,032 | 369,339 |
| Percentage | 50.59% | 46.94% |
County results
Wilson
40–50%
50–60%
60–70%
70–80%
80–90%
Hughes
40–50%
50–60%
60–70%
70–80%
80–90%
President before election
Woodrow Wilson
Democratic
Elected President
Woodrow Wilson
Democratic

The 1916 United States presidential election in Missouri was held on November 7, 1916 as part of the 1916 United States presidential election. Voters chose 18 representatives, or electors, to the Electoral College, who voted for president and vice president.

Missouri was won by incumbent President, Woodrow Wilson (D–New Jersey), running with Vice President Thomas R. Marshall, with 50.59% of the popular vote, against Supreme Court Justice Charles Evans Hughes (R–New York), running with former vice president Charles W. Fairbanks, with 46.94% of the popular vote. Had Hughes carried the state of Missouri, he would have had 272 electoral votes, enough to win the presidency.

This election was the first in which Missouri voted more Republican than Kansas since the latter's statehood. This would not recur until 2020.

== Results ==
1916 United States presidential election in Missouri
| Party | Candidate | Votes | % |
|---|---|---|---|
| Democratic | Woodrow Wilson (incumbent) | 398,032 | 50.59% |
| Republican | Charles Evans Hughes | 369,339 | 46.94% |
| Socialist | Allan L. Benson | 14,612 | 1.86% |
| Prohibition | Frank Hanly | 3,884 | 0.49% |
| Socialist Labor | Arthur E. Reimer | 902 | 0.11% |
| Total votes | | 786,769 | 100% |

=== Results by county ===
1916 United States presidential election in Missouri by county
| County | Woodrow Wilson Democratic | | Charles Evans Hughes Republican | | Allan L. Benson Socialist | | Frank Hanly Prohibition | | Arthur E. Reimer Socialist Labor | | Margin | | Total votes cast |
| County | # | % | # | % | # | % | # | % | # | % | # | % | Total votes cast |
|---|---|---|---|---|---|---|---|---|---|---|---|---|---|
| Adair | 2,275 | 43.36% | 2,681 | 51.10% | 244 | 4.65% | 38 | 0.72% | 9 | 0.17% | -406 | -7.74% | 5,247 |
| Andrew | 1,853 | 46.60% | 2,087 | 52.49% | 16 | 0.40% | 20 | 0.50% | 0 | 0.00% | -234 | -5.89% | 3,976 |
| Atchison | 1,697 | 50.22% | 1,626 | 48.12% | 27 | 0.80% | 27 | 0.80% | 2 | 0.06% | 71 | 2.10% | 3,379 |
| Audrain | 3,572 | 66.63% | 1,741 | 32.48% | 25 | 0.47% | 16 | 0.30% | 7 | 0.13% | 1,831 | 34.15% | 5,361 |
| Barry | 2,752 | 49.05% | 2,683 | 47.82% | 148 | 2.64% | 17 | 0.30% | 11 | 0.20% | 69 | 1.23% | 5,611 |
| Barton | 2,217 | 55.20% | 1,597 | 39.77% | 154 | 3.83% | 40 | 1.00% | 8 | 0.20% | 620 | 15.44% | 4,016 |
| Bates | 3,255 | 53.75% | 2,597 | 42.88% | 129 | 2.13% | 67 | 1.11% | 8 | 0.13% | 658 | 10.87% | 6,056 |
| Benton | 1,285 | 40.37% | 1,842 | 57.87% | 26 | 0.82% | 27 | 0.85% | 3 | 0.09% | -557 | -17.50% | 3,183 |
| Bollinger | 1,538 | 47.40% | 1,624 | 50.05% | 69 | 2.13% | 13 | 0.40% | 1 | 0.03% | -86 | -2.65% | 3,245 |
| Boone | 5,601 | 71.46% | 2,180 | 27.81% | 30 | 0.38% | 23 | 0.29% | 4 | 0.05% | 3,421 | 43.65% | 7,838 |
| Buchanan | 10,973 | 57.35% | 7,761 | 40.56% | 278 | 1.45% | 93 | 0.49% | 29 | 0.15% | 3,212 | 16.79% | 19,134 |
| Butler | 2,135 | 42.24% | 2,717 | 53.76% | 174 | 3.44% | 13 | 0.26% | 15 | 0.30% | -582 | -11.52% | 5,054 |
| Caldwell | 1,683 | 44.52% | 2,069 | 54.74% | 3 | 0.08% | 23 | 0.61% | 2 | 0.05% | -386 | -10.21% | 3,780 |
| Callaway | 3,882 | 65.59% | 2,009 | 33.94% | 15 | 0.25% | 12 | 0.20% | 1 | 0.02% | 1,873 | 31.64% | 5,919 |
| Camden | 930 | 41.43% | 1,261 | 56.17% | 41 | 1.83% | 8 | 0.36% | 5 | 0.22% | -331 | -14.74% | 2,245 |
| Cape Girardeau | 2,993 | 43.55% | 3,753 | 54.60% | 74 | 1.08% | 44 | 0.64% | 9 | 0.13% | -760 | -11.06% | 6,873 |
| Carroll | 2,822 | 48.00% | 2,978 | 50.65% | 43 | 0.73% | 36 | 0.61% | 0 | 0.00% | -156 | -2.65% | 5,879 |
| Carter | 586 | 51.86% | 469 | 41.50% | 66 | 5.84% | 6 | 0.53% | 3 | 0.27% | 117 | 10.35% | 1,130 |
| Cass | 3,337 | 60.19% | 2,104 | 37.95% | 60 | 1.08% | 43 | 0.78% | 0 | 0.00% | 1,233 | 22.24% | 5,544 |
| Cedar | 1,410 | 41.59% | 1,874 | 55.28% | 74 | 2.18% | 27 | 0.80% | 5 | 0.15% | -464 | -13.69% | 3,390 |
| Chariton | 3,135 | 58.30% | 2,183 | 40.60% | 22 | 0.41% | 36 | 0.67% | 1 | 0.02% | 952 | 17.71% | 5,377 |
| Christian | 938 | 30.52% | 1,978 | 64.37% | 141 | 4.59% | 14 | 0.46% | 2 | 0.07% | -1,040 | -33.84% | 3,073 |
| Clark | 1,692 | 48.12% | 1,782 | 50.68% | 28 | 0.80% | 12 | 0.34% | 2 | 0.06% | -90 | -2.56% | 3,516 |
| Clay | 3,902 | 74.13% | 1,307 | 24.83% | 38 | 0.72% | 12 | 0.23% | 5 | 0.09% | 2,595 | 49.30% | 5,264 |
| Clinton | 2,153 | 57.05% | 1,551 | 41.10% | 19 | 0.50% | 48 | 1.27% | 3 | 0.08% | 602 | 15.95% | 3,774 |
| Cole | 2,915 | 51.11% | 2,746 | 48.15% | 31 | 0.54% | 10 | 0.18% | 1 | 0.02% | 169 | 2.96% | 5,703 |
| Cooper | 2,537 | 46.86% | 2,830 | 52.27% | 18 | 0.33% | 29 | 0.54% | 0 | 0.00% | -293 | -5.41% | 5,414 |
| Crawford | 1,312 | 43.43% | 1,642 | 54.35% | 47 | 1.56% | 18 | 0.60% | 2 | 0.07% | -330 | -10.92% | 3,021 |
| Dade | 1,618 | 44.50% | 1,941 | 53.38% | 54 | 1.49% | 23 | 0.63% | 0 | 0.00% | -323 | -8.88% | 3,636 |
| Dallas | 1,022 | 40.73% | 1,428 | 56.92% | 47 | 1.87% | 12 | 0.48% | 0 | 0.00% | -406 | -16.18% | 2,509 |
| Daviess | 2,375 | 49.75% | 2,342 | 49.06% | 12 | 0.25% | 44 | 0.92% | 1 | 0.02% | 33 | 0.69% | 4,774 |
| DeKalb | 1,647 | 49.43% | 1,640 | 49.22% | 12 | 0.36% | 31 | 0.93% | 2 | 0.06% | 7 | 0.21% | 3,332 |
| Dent | 1,457 | 52.35% | 1,252 | 44.99% | 66 | 2.37% | 5 | 0.18% | 3 | 0.11% | 205 | 7.37% | 2,783 |
| Douglas | 737 | 27.80% | 1,730 | 65.26% | 164 | 6.19% | 14 | 0.53% | 6 | 0.23% | -993 | -37.46% | 2,651 |
| Dunklin | 3,723 | 61.71% | 1,924 | 31.89% | 375 | 6.22% | 8 | 0.13% | 3 | 0.05% | 1,799 | 29.82% | 6,033 |
| Franklin | 2,468 | 35.59% | 4,325 | 62.36% | 94 | 1.36% | 42 | 0.61% | 6 | 0.09% | -1,857 | -26.78% | 6,935 |
| Gasconade | 510 | 16.68% | 2,513 | 82.20% | 19 | 0.62% | 13 | 0.43% | 2 | 0.07% | -2,003 | -65.52% | 3,057 |
| Gentry | 2,404 | 55.80% | 1,823 | 42.32% | 33 | 0.77% | 45 | 1.04% | 3 | 0.07% | 581 | 13.49% | 4,308 |
| Greene | 7,191 | 46.66% | 7,543 | 48.95% | 542 | 3.52% | 122 | 0.79% | 12 | 0.08% | -352 | -2.28% | 15,410 |
| Grundy | 1,789 | 40.90% | 2,481 | 56.72% | 46 | 1.05% | 53 | 1.21% | 5 | 0.11% | -692 | -15.82% | 4,374 |
| Harrison | 2,205 | 43.33% | 2,741 | 53.86% | 62 | 1.22% | 77 | 1.51% | 4 | 0.08% | -536 | -10.53% | 5,089 |
| Henry | 3,653 | 56.12% | 2,727 | 41.90% | 71 | 1.09% | 49 | 0.75% | 9 | 0.14% | 926 | 14.23% | 6,509 |
| Hickory | 552 | 31.24% | 1,144 | 64.74% | 59 | 3.34% | 11 | 0.62% | 1 | 0.06% | -592 | -33.50% | 1,767 |
| Holt | 1,615 | 43.77% | 2,030 | 55.01% | 14 | 0.38% | 29 | 0.79% | 2 | 0.05% | -415 | -11.25% | 3,690 |
| Howard | 2,866 | 71.24% | 1,121 | 27.86% | 16 | 0.40% | 18 | 0.45% | 2 | 0.05% | 1,745 | 43.38% | 4,023 |
| Howell | 1,861 | 43.84% | 2,132 | 50.22% | 225 | 5.30% | 23 | 0.54% | 4 | 0.09% | -271 | -6.38% | 4,245 |
| Iron | 1,027 | 53.05% | 874 | 45.14% | 24 | 1.24% | 9 | 0.46% | 2 | 0.10% | 153 | 7.90% | 1,936 |
| Jackson | 44,556 | 56.38% | 32,943 | 41.68% | 1,094 | 1.38% | 336 | 0.43% | 100 | 0.13% | 11,613 | 14.69% | 79,029 |
| Jasper | 10,513 | 49.97% | 9,358 | 44.48% | 913 | 4.34% | 197 | 0.94% | 56 | 0.27% | 1,155 | 5.49% | 21,037 |
| Jefferson | 3,021 | 46.56% | 3,310 | 51.01% | 130 | 2.00% | 19 | 0.29% | 9 | 0.14% | -289 | -4.45% | 6,489 |
| Johnson | 3,701 | 54.69% | 2,966 | 43.83% | 62 | 0.92% | 29 | 0.43% | 9 | 0.13% | 735 | 10.86% | 6,767 |
| Knox | 1,657 | 52.11% | 1,460 | 45.91% | 37 | 1.16% | 23 | 0.72% | 3 | 0.09% | 197 | 6.19% | 3,180 |
| Laclede | 1,755 | 47.01% | 1,877 | 50.28% | 89 | 2.38% | 9 | 0.24% | 3 | 0.08% | -122 | -3.27% | 3,733 |
| Lafayette | 4,073 | 49.38% | 4,049 | 49.09% | 93 | 1.13% | 29 | 0.35% | 4 | 0.05% | 24 | 0.29% | 8,248 |
| Lawrence | 2,809 | 44.24% | 3,228 | 50.83% | 260 | 4.09% | 44 | 0.69% | 9 | 0.14% | -419 | -6.60% | 6,350 |
| Lewis | 2,357 | 61.49% | 1,429 | 37.28% | 25 | 0.65% | 20 | 0.52% | 2 | 0.05% | 928 | 24.21% | 3,833 |
| Lincoln | 2,468 | 59.61% | 1,642 | 39.66% | 11 | 0.27% | 19 | 0.46% | 0 | 0.00% | 826 | 19.95% | 4,140 |
| Linn | 3,441 | 54.02% | 2,801 | 43.97% | 81 | 1.27% | 46 | 0.72% | 1 | 0.02% | 640 | 10.05% | 6,370 |
| Livingston | 2,609 | 51.07% | 2,424 | 47.45% | 39 | 0.76% | 35 | 0.69% | 2 | 0.04% | 185 | 3.62% | 5,109 |
| Macon | 3,805 | 53.87% | 3,034 | 42.96% | 164 | 2.32% | 52 | 0.74% | 8 | 0.11% | 771 | 10.92% | 7,063 |
| Madison | 1,310 | 50.95% | 1,230 | 47.84% | 21 | 0.82% | 8 | 0.31% | 2 | 0.08% | 80 | 3.11% | 2,571 |
| Maries | 1,319 | 63.60% | 725 | 34.96% | 20 | 0.96% | 7 | 0.34% | 3 | 0.14% | 594 | 28.64% | 2,074 |
| Marion | 4,534 | 61.26% | 2,759 | 37.28% | 53 | 0.72% | 53 | 0.72% | 2 | 0.03% | 1,775 | 23.98% | 7,401 |
| McDonald | 1,631 | 51.43% | 1,414 | 44.59% | 93 | 2.93% | 26 | 0.82% | 7 | 0.22% | 217 | 6.84% | 3,171 |
| Mercer | 1,042 | 36.75% | 1,733 | 61.13% | 28 | 0.99% | 32 | 1.13% | 0 | 0.00% | -691 | -24.37% | 2,835 |
| Miller | 1,395 | 41.59% | 1,862 | 55.52% | 88 | 2.62% | 8 | 0.24% | 1 | 0.03% | -467 | -13.92% | 3,354 |
| Mississippi | 1,874 | 57.43% | 1,330 | 40.76% | 48 | 1.47% | 7 | 0.21% | 4 | 0.12% | 544 | 16.67% | 3,263 |
| Moniteau | 1,675 | 48.19% | 1,748 | 50.29% | 35 | 1.01% | 16 | 0.46% | 2 | 0.06% | -73 | -2.10% | 3,476 |
| Monroe | 3,738 | 81.60% | 742 | 16.20% | 86 | 1.88% | 14 | 0.31% | 1 | 0.02% | 2,996 | 65.40% | 4,581 |
| Montgomery | 1,988 | 48.26% | 2,079 | 50.47% | 18 | 0.44% | 33 | 0.80% | 1 | 0.02% | -91 | -2.21% | 4,119 |
| Morgan | 1,368 | 46.11% | 1,578 | 53.19% | 13 | 0.44% | 7 | 0.24% | 1 | 0.03% | -210 | -7.08% | 2,967 |
| New Madrid | 2,715 | 55.65% | 2,039 | 41.79% | 99 | 2.03% | 18 | 0.37% | 8 | 0.16% | 676 | 13.86% | 4,879 |
| Newton | 3,158 | 49.27% | 2,929 | 45.70% | 249 | 3.89% | 64 | 1.00% | 9 | 0.14% | 229 | 3.57% | 6,409 |
| Nodaway | 3,874 | 51.60% | 3,540 | 47.15% | 41 | 0.55% | 44 | 0.59% | 9 | 0.12% | 334 | 4.45% | 7,508 |
| Oregon | 1,799 | 70.66% | 660 | 25.92% | 82 | 3.22% | 5 | 0.20% | 0 | 0.00% | 1,139 | 44.74% | 2,546 |
| Osage | 1,383 | 43.44% | 1,769 | 55.56% | 24 | 0.75% | 8 | 0.25% | 0 | 0.00% | -386 | -12.12% | 3,184 |
| Ozark | 654 | 32.38% | 1,331 | 65.89% | 26 | 1.29% | 9 | 0.45% | 0 | 0.00% | -677 | -33.51% | 2,020 |
| Pemiscot | 2,447 | 52.95% | 2,076 | 44.93% | 95 | 2.06% | 3 | 0.06% | 0 | 0.00% | 371 | 8.03% | 4,621 |
| Perry | 1,396 | 41.01% | 1,988 | 58.40% | 10 | 0.29% | 8 | 0.24% | 2 | 0.06% | -592 | -17.39% | 3,404 |
| Pettis | 4,665 | 50.13% | 4,319 | 46.42% | 253 | 2.72% | 63 | 0.68% | 5 | 0.05% | 346 | 3.72% | 9,305 |
| Phelps | 1,887 | 55.13% | 1,487 | 43.44% | 36 | 1.05% | 8 | 0.23% | 5 | 0.15% | 400 | 11.69% | 3,423 |
| Pike | 3,344 | 58.42% | 2,322 | 40.57% | 45 | 0.79% | 12 | 0.21% | 1 | 0.02% | 1,022 | 17.85% | 5,724 |
| Platte | 2,974 | 75.96% | 921 | 23.52% | 11 | 0.28% | 8 | 0.20% | 1 | 0.03% | 2,053 | 52.44% | 3,915 |
| Polk | 2,149 | 44.24% | 2,613 | 53.79% | 63 | 1.30% | 30 | 0.62% | 3 | 0.06% | -464 | -9.55% | 4,858 |
| Pulaski | 1,339 | 56.00% | 1,003 | 41.95% | 40 | 1.67% | 6 | 0.25% | 3 | 0.13% | 336 | 14.05% | 2,391 |
| Putnam | 1,035 | 31.87% | 2,106 | 64.84% | 59 | 1.82% | 42 | 1.29% | 6 | 0.18% | -1,071 | -32.97% | 3,248 |
| Ralls | 1,994 | 70.11% | 826 | 29.04% | 9 | 0.32% | 14 | 0.49% | 1 | 0.04% | 1,168 | 41.07% | 2,844 |
| Randolph | 5,081 | 69.84% | 2,111 | 29.02% | 45 | 0.62% | 36 | 0.49% | 2 | 0.03% | 2,970 | 40.82% | 7,275 |
| Ray | 3,380 | 65.47% | 1,718 | 33.28% | 32 | 0.62% | 29 | 0.56% | 4 | 0.08% | 1,662 | 32.19% | 5,163 |
| Reynolds | 1,209 | 65.39% | 592 | 32.02% | 35 | 1.89% | 4 | 0.22% | 9 | 0.49% | 617 | 33.37% | 1,849 |
| Ripley | 1,325 | 53.08% | 1,053 | 42.19% | 105 | 4.21% | 10 | 0.40% | 3 | 0.12% | 272 | 10.90% | 2,496 |
| Saint Charles | 1,914 | 34.91% | 3,518 | 64.16% | 33 | 0.60% | 12 | 0.22% | 6 | 0.11% | -1,604 | -29.25% | 5,483 |
| Saint Clair | 1,881 | 50.15% | 1,718 | 45.80% | 115 | 3.07% | 34 | 0.91% | 3 | 0.08% | 163 | 4.35% | 3,751 |
| Saint Francois | 3,675 | 53.38% | 3,015 | 43.79% | 157 | 2.28% | 33 | 0.48% | 5 | 0.07% | 660 | 9.59% | 6,885 |
| Saint Louis County | 7,587 | 36.71% | 12,485 | 60.41% | 454 | 2.20% | 99 | 0.48% | 41 | 0.20% | -4,898 | -23.70% | 20,666 |
| Saint Louis City | 74,059 | 45.71% | 83,798 | 51.72% | 3,484 | 2.15% | 432 | 0.27% | 259 | 0.16% | -9,739 | -6.01% | 162,032 |
| Sainte Genevieve | 1,218 | 51.35% | 1,137 | 47.93% | 14 | 0.59% | 3 | 0.13% | 0 | 0.00% | 81 | 3.41% | 2,372 |
| Saline | 4,503 | 59.53% | 2,966 | 39.21% | 26 | 0.34% | 55 | 0.73% | 14 | 0.19% | 1,537 | 20.32% | 7,564 |
| Schuyler | 1,341 | 56.42% | 995 | 41.86% | 15 | 0.63% | 25 | 1.05% | 1 | 0.04% | 346 | 14.56% | 2,377 |
| Scotland | 1,592 | 54.90% | 1,243 | 42.86% | 51 | 1.76% | 14 | 0.48% | 0 | 0.00% | 349 | 12.03% | 2,900 |
| Scott | 2,816 | 52.72% | 2,285 | 42.78% | 201 | 3.76% | 24 | 0.45% | 15 | 0.28% | 531 | 9.94% | 5,341 |
| Shannon | 1,213 | 56.31% | 788 | 36.58% | 141 | 6.55% | 3 | 0.14% | 9 | 0.42% | 425 | 19.73% | 2,154 |
| Shelby | 2,549 | 67.26% | 1,195 | 31.53% | 21 | 0.55% | 23 | 0.61% | 2 | 0.05% | 1,354 | 35.73% | 3,790 |
| Stoddard | 3,274 | 53.59% | 2,482 | 40.63% | 314 | 5.14% | 28 | 0.46% | 11 | 0.18% | 792 | 12.96% | 6,109 |
| Stone | 621 | 27.38% | 1,525 | 67.24% | 116 | 5.11% | 6 | 0.26% | 0 | 0.00% | -904 | -39.86% | 2,268 |
| Sullivan | 2,446 | 49.54% | 2,420 | 49.02% | 40 | 0.81% | 28 | 0.57% | 3 | 0.06% | 26 | 0.53% | 4,937 |
| Taney | 679 | 36.80% | 1,123 | 60.87% | 34 | 1.84% | 7 | 0.38% | 2 | 0.11% | -444 | -24.07% | 1,845 |
| Texas | 2,291 | 54.35% | 1,809 | 42.92% | 86 | 2.04% | 27 | 0.64% | 2 | 0.05% | 482 | 11.44% | 4,215 |
| Vernon | 3,776 | 60.63% | 2,211 | 35.50% | 193 | 3.10% | 37 | 0.59% | 11 | 0.18% | 1,565 | 25.13% | 6,228 |
| Warren | 487 | 21.31% | 1,752 | 76.67% | 41 | 1.79% | 3 | 0.13% | 2 | 0.09% | -1,265 | -55.36% | 2,285 |
| Washington | 1,394 | 45.26% | 1,657 | 53.80% | 24 | 0.78% | 5 | 0.16% | 0 | 0.00% | -263 | -8.54% | 3,080 |
| Wayne | 1,594 | 49.37% | 1,528 | 47.32% | 92 | 2.85% | 14 | 0.43% | 1 | 0.03% | 66 | 2.04% | 3,229 |
| Webster | 1,903 | 46.22% | 2,114 | 51.35% | 61 | 1.48% | 33 | 0.80% | 6 | 0.15% | -211 | -5.13% | 4,117 |
| Worth | 1,079 | 53.57% | 892 | 44.29% | 7 | 0.35% | 36 | 1.79% | 0 | 0.00% | 187 | 9.29% | 2,014 |
| Wright | 1,593 | 41.21% | 2,176 | 56.29% | 77 | 1.99% | 16 | 0.41% | 4 | 0.10% | -583 | -15.08% | 3,866 |
| Totals | 398,032 | 50.59% | 369,339 | 46.94% | 14,612 | 1.86% | 3,884 | 0.49% | 902 | 0.11% | 28,693 | 3.65% | 786,769 |

== See also ==
- United States presidential elections in Missouri
