= Somerset Township, Mercer County, Missouri =

Township in Mercer County, Missouri, U.S.

Coordinates: 40.5222°N 93.4375°W

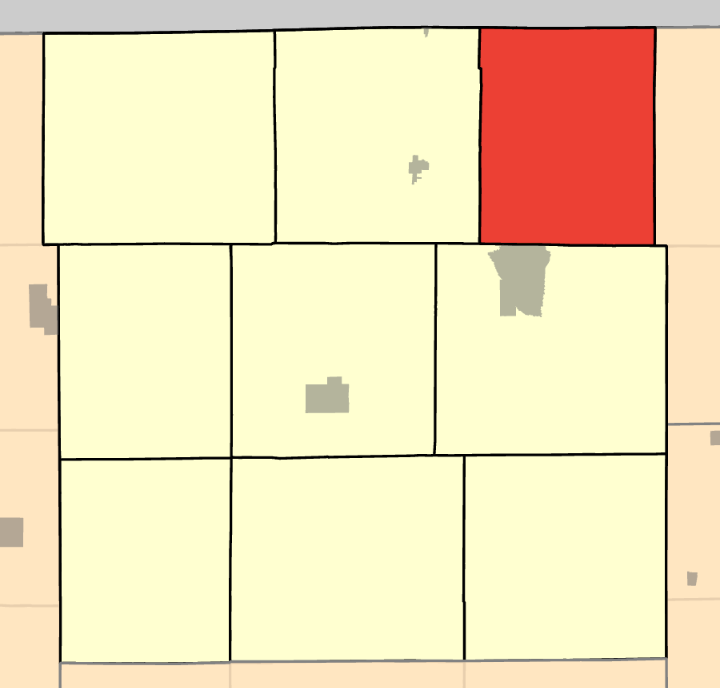

Somerset Township is a township in Mercer County, in the U.S. state of Missouri.

Somerset Township was established in 1857, and named after an old variant name of the community of Cleopatra, Missouri.

== Transportation ==
The following highways travel through the township:

- Route M
- Route W
- Route Z
