= Princeton R-V School District =

School district in Missouri, U.S.

Address
- 1008 East Coleman Street Princeton, Missouri, 64673; United States

District information
- Type: Public
- Grades: PreK–12
- NCES District ID: 2925590

Students and staff
- Students: 339
- Teachers: 34.08
- Staff: 34.55
- Student–teacher ratio: 9.95

Other information
- Website: www.tigertown.k12.mo.us

Princeton R-V School District is a school district headquartered in Princeton, Missouri. It operates an elementary school and a combined junior and senior high school.

The majority of the district is in Mercer County, and includes Princeton and southern portions of Ravanna. Small portions are in Grundy County.

== History ==
In 1983 both the Coca-Cola and Pepsi companies lobbied to get the rights to have their drinks sold at school district events. The district previously used Pepsi, which offered to give $800 to an organization related to the district, but the district selected Coca-Cola, which offered to fund two annual scholarships, worth $200 each, and to give the district a new scoreboard for athletic games.

In 2006 the district proposed a school bond, and voters approved it with six being the margin of victory. The bond had a value of $3,000,000.

== Athletics ==
In 2005 the district made a sports team sharing arrangement with the North Mercer School District, so Princeton handles American football for both districts while North Mercer handles boys' softball.
