= Ravanna, Missouri =

Census-designated place in Missouri, U.S.

- Location within Missouri Location within the United States
- Coordinates: 40°27′22″N 93°27′43″W
- Country: United States
- State: Missouri
- County: Mercer

Area
  - Total: 3.97 sq mi (10.28 km^{2})
  - Land: 3.95 sq mi (10.24 km^{2})
  - Water: 0.012 sq mi (0.03 km^{2})
- Elevation: 1,073 ft (327 m)

Population (2020)
  - Total: 60
  - Density: 15.17/sq mi (5.86/km^{2})
- FIPS code: 29-60644
- GNIS feature ID: 2587109
- ZIP Code: 64673 (Princeton)

Ravanna is an unincorporated community and census-designated place (CDP) in Mercer County, Missouri, United States. It is located 8 miles (13 km) northeast of Princeton on U.S. Route 136. The population was 60 at the 2020 census, down from 98 in 2010.

Ravanna was platted in 1857. A variant name was "Sonoma". A post office called "Sonoma" was established in 1855, the name was changed to Ravanna in 1858, and the post office closed in 1975. The present name most likely is a transfer from Ravenna, Ohio.

== Education ==
The northern half is in the North Mercer School District, including the main townsite, while other parts are in the Princeton R-5 School District. The community was previously part of the Ravanna R-IV School District until the school closed in 1977 due to financial problems. Ravanna's mascot was the Ranger.

== Demographics ==
Historical population
Census	Pop.	Note	%±
1880	171		—
1890	348		103.5%
1900	295		−15.2%
1910	251		−14.9%
1920	197		−21.5%
1930	218		10.7%
1940	177		−18.8%
1950	132		−25.4%
1960	127		−3.8%
2010	98		—
2020	60		−38.8%
U.S. Decennial Census.
