= Mercer County, Missouri =

County in Missouri, United States

- County
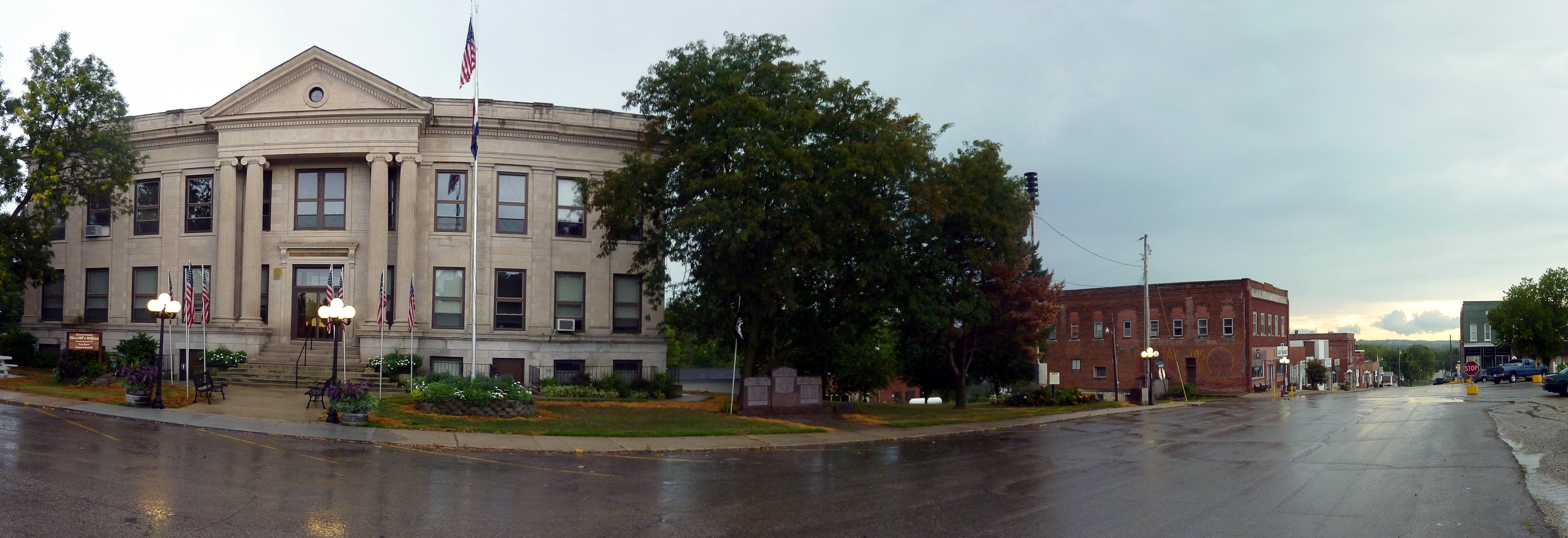
- Mercer County Courthouse and downtown Princeton

- Location within the U.S. state of Missouri
- Coordinates: 40°25′N 93°34′W
- Country: United States
- State: Missouri
- Founded: February 14, 1845
- Named for: John Francis Mercer
- Seat: Princeton
- Largest city: Princeton

Area
  - Total: 455 sq mi (1,180 km^{2})
  - Land: 454 sq mi (1,180 km^{2})
  - Water: 1.3 sq mi (3.4 km^{2}) 0.3%

Population (2020)
  - Total: 3,538
  - Estimate (2025): 3,404 ▼
  - Density: 7.6/sq mi (2.9/km^{2})
- Time zone: UTC−6 (Central)
  - Summer (DST): UTC−5 (CDT)
- Congressional district: 6th

Mercer County is a county located in the northwestern portion of the U.S. state of Missouri. As of the 2020 census, the population was 3,538, making it the second-least populous county in Missouri. Its county seat is Princeton. The county was organized February 14, 1845, and named for General John F. Mercer of the Revolutionary War.

== History ==
=== Early years ===
Mercer County was organized February 14, 1845, from part of Grundy County. It is named in honor of General Hugh Mercer, who fought and died in the American Revolutionary War. The first permanent settlements in what is now Mercer County were in 1837, when a few families from other parts of Missouri moved to the area. James Parsons, a Tennessee native, is generally considered to be the first permanent settler, in the spring of 1837. The land was still included as part of Livingston County at that time and would remain so until 1841 when it would become part of the newly created Grundy County. Prior to 1837, the land was used by Native American tribes, primarily the Sac/Fox and Potawatomi, as prime hunting grounds. The occasional temporary hunting village would be established by the tribes; otherwise, the land was devoid of humans. The town of Princeton, named for the battle where General Mercer was killed, was established as the county seat in 1847. The northern boundary of the county was in dispute for the first six years of its existence due to the Honey War, a bloodless territorial dispute between Missouri and Iowa. The boundary was 9.5 miles farther north than present day prior to an 1851 decision by the U.S. Supreme Court.

=== Civil War ===
Mercer County, like its neighbor to the east Putnam County, was a staunch supporter of the Union. Most county residents had roots in northern U.S. states "back east" like New York, Pennsylvania, Ohio, and Indiana, and did not have the strong slave-holding tradition of other northern Missouri counties like Macon, Audrain, and Monroe (commonly referred to as Little Dixie), whose population largely emigrated from Southern states. In the 1860 U.S. Census, only 12 Mercer County families were listed as slave owners, with a combined total of 24 slaves. Fewer than 20 Mercer County men fought for the Confederacy, while well over 1,000 volunteered for Union service. Among the units containing men from Mercer County were the 23rd, 27th and 35th Regiments, the 2nd and 12th Cavalry, the 5th Kansas Cavalry, and various smaller units of the Missouri State Militia. The 44th Missouri Infantry (USA), consisting of men from Mercer, Grundy, Sullivan, and other northwest Missouri counties, served a pivotal role in the Union victory at the Battle of Franklin, Tennessee, on November 30, 1864.

== Geography ==
According to the U.S. Census Bureau, the county has a total area of 455 square miles (1,180 km^{2}), of which 454 square miles (1,180 km^{2}) is land and 1.3 square miles (3.4 km^{2}) (0.3%) is water.

=== Adjacent counties ===
- Decatur County, Iowa (northwest)
- Wayne County, Iowa (north)
- Putnam County (east)
- Sullivan County (southeast)
- Grundy County (south)
- Harrison County (west)

=== Major highways ===
- U.S. Route 65
- U.S. Route 136
- Route 145

== Demographics ==
Historical population
Census	Pop.	Note	%±
1850	2,691		—
1860	9,300		245.6%
1870	11,557		24.3%
1880	14,673		27.0%
1890	14,581		−0.6%
1900	14,706		0.9%
1910	12,335		−16.1%
1920	11,281		−8.5%
1930	9,350		−17.1%
1940	8,766		−6.2%
1950	7,235		−17.5%
1960	5,750		−20.5%
1970	4,910		−14.6%
1980	4,685		−4.6%
1990	3,723		−20.5%
2000	3,757		0.9%
2010	3,785		0.7%
2020	3,538		−6.5%
2025 (est.)	3,404	▼	−3.8%
U.S. Decennial Census:

=== 2020 census ===
As of the 2020 census, the county had a population of 3,538. The median age was 43.7 years. 22.9% of residents were under the age of 18 and 22.6% of residents were 65 years of age or older. For every 100 females there were 103.0 males, and for every 100 females age 18 and over there were 101.3 males age 18 and over.

The racial makeup of the county was 93.4% White, 0.0% Black or African American, 1.3% American Indian and Alaska Native, 0.1% Asian, 0.0% Native Hawaiian and Pacific Islander, 2.2% from some other race, and 3.0% from two or more races. Hispanic or Latino residents of any race comprised 4.4% of the population.

0.0% of residents lived in urban areas, while 100.0% lived in rural areas.

There were 1,454 households in the county, of which 28.5% had children under the age of 18 living with them and 22.2% had a female householder with no spouse or partner present. About 30.2% of all households were made up of individuals and 15.4% had someone living alone who was 65 years of age or older.

There were 1,911 housing units, of which 23.9% were vacant. Among occupied housing units, 75.0% were owner-occupied and 25.0% were renter-occupied. The homeowner vacancy rate was 1.4% and the rental vacancy rate was 7.4%.

=== Racial and ethnic composition ===
Mercer County, Missouri – Racial and ethnic composition Note: the US Census treats Hispanic/Latino as an ethnic category. This table excludes Latinos from the racial categories and assigns them to a separate category. Hispanics/Latinos may be of any race.
Race / Ethnicity (NH = Non-Hispanic)	Pop 1980	Pop 1990	Pop 2000	Pop 2010	Pop 2020	% 1980	% 1990	% 2000	% 2010	% 2020
White alone (NH)	4,662	3,706	3,704	3,683	3,291	99.51%	99.54%	98.59%	97.31%	93.02%
Black or African American alone (NH)	2	3	7	6	0	0.04%	0.08%	0.19%	0.16%	0.00%
Native American or Alaska Native alone (NH)	9	6	19	17	8	0.19%	0.16%	0.51%	0.45%	0.23%
Asian alone (NH)	0	1	0	19	0	0.00%	0.03%	0.00%	0.50%	0.00%
Native Hawaiian or Pacific Islander alone (NH)	x	x	0	0	0	x	x	0.00%	0.00%	0.00%
Other race alone (NH)	0	0	0	0	7	0.00%	0.00%	0.00%	0.00%	0.20%
Mixed race or Multiracial (NH)	x	x	16	32	77	x	x	0.43%	0.85%	2.18%
Hispanic or Latino (any race)	12	7	11	28	155	0.26%	0.19%	0.29%	0.74%	4.38%
Total	4,685	3,723	3,757	3,785	3,538	100.00%	100.00%	100.00%	100.00%	100.00%

=== 2010 census ===
As of the census of 2010, there were 3,785 people, 1,600 households, and 1,089 families residing in the county. The population density was 8 people per square mile (3.1 people/km^{2}). There were 2,125 housing units at an average density of 5 units per square mile (1.9/km^{2}). The racial makeup of the county was 98.72% White, 0.19% Black or African American, 0.56% Native American, 0.05% Pacific Islander, 0.03% from other races, and 0.45% from two or more races. Approximately 0.29% of the population were Hispanic or Latino of any race.

There were 1,600 households, out of which 28.30% had children under the age of 18 living with them, 57.60% were married couples living together, 6.70% had a female householder with no husband present, and 31.90% were non-families. 29.30% of all households were made up of individuals, and 17.60% had someone living alone who was 65 years of age or older. The average household size was 2.31 and the average family size was 2.83.

In the county, the population was spread out, with 23.00% under the age of 18, 6.70% from 18 to 24, 24.20% from 25 to 44, 24.00% from 45 to 64, and 22.00% who were 65 years of age or older. The median age was 42 years. For every 100 females there were 95.70 males. For every 100 females age 18 and over, there were 92.60 males.

The median income for a household in the county was $29,640, and the median income for a family was $35,313. Males had a median income of $26,690 versus $19,814 for females. The per capita income for the county was $15,140. About 10.20% of families and 13.30% of the population were below the poverty line, including 13.30% of those under age 18 and 14.50% of those age 65 or over.

=== Religion ===
Religion in Mercer County, according to ARDA (2020)
1. Evangelicals Churches (62.5%)
2. Anabaptist Churches (Amish and Mennonite) (9.10%)
3. Mainline Protestant Churches (6.20%)
4. 0.00%
5. None (19.6%)

== Education ==
- North Mercer School District - Mercer
  - North Mercer County Elementary School (PK-06)
  - Mercer High School (07-12)
- Princeton R-V School District - Princeton
  - Princeton Elementary School (PK-06)
  - Princeton High School (07-12)

=== Public libraries ===
- Mercer County Library

== Communities ==
=== Cities ===
- Mercer
- Princeton (county seat)

=== Village ===
- South Lineville

=== Census-designated place ===
- Ravanna

=== Other communities ===
- Mill Grove
- Modena

=== Historical communities ===
- Adel 40°31′53″N 93°40′08″W
- Alvord 40°27′20″N 93°35′43″W
- Burrows 40°30′58″N 93°45′20″W
- Cleopatra 40°32′55″N 93°24′15″W
- Dinsmore 40°20′28″N 93°44′41″W
- Goshen 40°22′58″N 93°40′46″W
- Half Rock 40°16′23″N 93°26′08″W
- Ilia 40°31′50″N 93°27′01″W
- Saline 40°31′37″N 93°43′40″W
- Topsy (Newtown) 40°21′11″N 93°28′47″W
- Wataga 40°33′38″N 93°37′59″W

=== Townships ===
- Harrison
- Lindley
- Madison
- Marion
- Medicine
- Morgan
- Ravanna
- Somerset
- Washington

== Politics ==
=== Local ===
The Republican Party predominantly controls politics at the local level in Mercer County. Republicans hold all of the elected positions in the county. In the 2020 presidential election, Mercer County had the highest Republican turnout in the state of Missouri with greater than 86% of the population voting for Donald Trump.

Mercer County, Missouri

Elected countywide officials
Assessor	Diane Blunk	Republican
Circuit Clerk	Tammy Crouse	Republican
County Clerk	Judy Hamilton	Republican
Collector	Susan Moore	Republican
Commissioner (presiding)	Jerry Allen	Republican
Commissioner (district 1)	Shane Grooms	Republican
Commissioner (district 2)	Zachary Martin	Republican
Coroner	Douglas B. Priest	Republican
Prosecuting Attorney	Lauren Horseman	Republican
Public Administrator	Kelli Judd	Republican
Recorder	Tammy Crouse	Republican
Sheriff	Steve Stockman	Republican
Treasurer	Susan Moore	Republican

=== State ===
Past Gubernatorial Elections Results
Year	Republican	Democratic	Third Parties
2024	85.16% 1,498	12.85% 226	1.99% 35
2020	86.86% 1,533	11.56% 204	1.58% 28
2016	71.58% 1,224	26.61% 455	1.81% 31
2012	66.26% 1,090	30.58% 503	3.16% 52
2008	60.29% 1,043	35.84% 620	3.87% 67
2004	69.69% 1,237	29.24% 519	1.07% 19
2000	64.20% 1,144	34.01% 606	1.79% 32
1996	34.10% 516	64.24% 972	1.65% 25

All of Mercer County is a part of Missouri's 3rd District in the Missouri House of Representatives and is represented by Danny Busick (R-Newtown).

Missouri House of Representatives — District 3 — Mercer County (2016)
Party	Candidate	Votes	%	±%
Republican	Nate Walker	1,510	100.00%	

Missouri House of Representatives — District 3 — Mercer County (2014)
Party	Candidate	Votes	%	±%
Republican	Nate Walker	1,018	100.00%	+24.34

Missouri House of Representatives — District 3 — Mercer County (2012)
Party	Candidate	Votes	%	±%
Republican	Nate Walker	1,220	74.66%	
Democratic	Rebecca McClanahan	414	25.34%	

All of Mercer County is a part of Missouri's 12th District in the Missouri Senate and is currently represented by Dan Hegeman (R-Cosby).

Missouri Senate — District 12 — Mercer County (2014)
Party	Candidate	Votes	%	±%
Republican	Dan Hegeman	986	100.00%	

=== Federal ===
U.S. Senate — Missouri — Mercer County (2016)
Party	Candidate	Votes	%	±%
Republican	Roy Blunt	1,231	72.37%	+22.34
Democratic	Jason Kander	396	23.28%	−17.58
Libertarian	Jonathan Dine	28	1.65%	−7.46
Green	Johnathan McFarland	18	1.06%	+1.06
Constitution	Fred Ryman	28	1.65%	+1.65

U.S. Senate — Missouri — Mercer County (2012)
Party	Candidate	Votes	%	±%
Republican	Todd Akin	813	50.03%	
Democratic	Claire McCaskill	664	40.86%	
Libertarian	Jonathan Dine	148	9.11%	

All of Mercer County is included in Missouri's 6th Congressional District and is currently represented by Sam Graves (R-Tarkio) in the U.S. House of Representatives.

U.S. House of Representatives — Missouri's 6th Congressional District — Mercer County (2016)
Party	Candidate	Votes	%	±%
Republican	Sam Graves	1,444	86.00%	+4.89
Democratic	David M. Blackwell	197	11.73%	−2.66
Libertarian	Russ Lee Monchil	30	1.79%	−2.71
Green	Mike Diel	8	0.48%	+0.48

U.S. House of Representatives — Missouri’s 6th Congressional District — Mercer County (2014)
Party	Candidate	Votes	%	±%
Republican	Sam Graves	992	81.11%	+0.03
Democratic	Bill Hedge	176	14.39%	−2.24
Libertarian	Russ Lee Monchil	55	4.50%	+2.21

U.S. House of Representatives — Missouri's 6th Congressional District — Mercer County (2012)
Party	Candidate	Votes	%	±%
Republican	Sam Graves	1,311	81.08%	
Democratic	Kyle Yarber	269	16.63%	
Libertarian	Russ Lee Monchil	37	2.29%	

United States presidential election results for Mercer County, Missouri
Year	Republican		Democratic		Third party(ies)	
Year	No.	%	No.	%	No.	%
1888	1,921	62.92%	1,097	35.93%	35	1.15%
1892	1,643	55.75%	809	27.45%	495	16.80%
1896	1,958	57.72%	1,405	41.42%	29	0.85%
1900	1,973	62.79%	1,106	35.20%	63	2.01%
1904	1,896	68.18%	819	29.45%	66	2.37%
1908	1,909	68.13%	852	30.41%	41	1.46%
1912	995	34.88%	780	27.34%	1,078	37.78%
1916	1,733	61.13%	1,042	36.75%	60	2.12%
1920	3,170	74.17%	1,044	24.43%	60	1.40%
1924	2,508	62.54%	1,209	30.15%	293	7.31%
1928	2,869	75.54%	925	24.35%	4	0.11%
1932	1,357	46.78%	1,520	52.40%	24	0.83%
1936	2,757	59.87%	1,834	39.83%	14	0.30%
1940	2,787	66.98%	1,364	32.78%	10	0.24%
1944	2,249	68.40%	1,035	31.48%	4	0.12%
1948	1,595	61.23%	1,008	38.69%	2	0.08%
1952	2,482	72.40%	936	27.30%	10	0.29%
1956	2,035	64.73%	1,109	35.27%	0	0.00%
1960	2,354	67.26%	1,146	32.74%	0	0.00%
1964	1,040	44.75%	1,284	55.25%	0	0.00%
1968	1,406	60.76%	783	33.84%	125	5.40%
1972	1,592	72.40%	607	27.60%	0	0.00%
1976	1,025	46.44%	1,177	53.33%	5	0.23%
1980	1,266	58.67%	821	38.04%	71	3.29%
1984	1,229	58.41%	875	41.59%	0	0.00%
1988	875	49.89%	877	50.00%	2	0.11%
1992	626	33.86%	843	45.59%	380	20.55%
1996	660	41.75%	700	44.28%	221	13.98%
2000	1,250	67.86%	555	30.13%	37	2.01%
2004	1,207	66.43%	582	32.03%	28	1.54%
2008	1,169	66.88%	519	29.69%	60	3.43%
2012	1,255	75.83%	353	21.33%	47	2.84%
2016	1,486	85.16%	216	12.38%	43	2.46%
2020	1,541	86.62%	222	12.48%	16	0.90%
2024	1,545	86.22%	235	13.11%	12	0.67%

== See also ==
- National Register of Historic Places listings in Mercer County, Missouri
- Roy Alvin Baldwin, Texas state representative who co-authored the 1923 legislation establishing Texas Tech University, born at Half Rock in Mercer County in 1885
