= Cedar Township, Callaway County, Missouri =

Township in the American state of Missouri

Cedar Township today
- Township
- Coordinates: 38°42′12″N 092°06′25″W
- Country: United States
- State: Missouri
- County: Callaway

Area
  - Total: 47.2 sq mi (122.2 km^{2})
  - Land: 47.02 sq mi (121.79 km^{2})
  - Water: 0.16 sq mi (0.41 km^{2}) 0.34%
- Elevation: 810 ft (247 m)

Population (2010)
  - Total: 2,937
  - Density: 62.46/sq mi (24.12/km^{2})
- FIPS code: 29-12160
- GNIS feature ID: 0766374

NOTE: Cedar Township in Callaway County no longer contains the town of Cedar City (now incorporated into Jefferson City) since boundary changes creating Summit Township from its former southern sector sometime between 1883 and 1897 . This has caused some confusion in historical, geographic, and genealogical research—see "History" section below.

Cedar Township is today one of eighteen townships in Callaway County, Missouri, USA. As of the 2010 census, its population was 2,937.

== Geography ==
Cedar Township today covers an area of 47.18 square miles (122.2 km^{2}) and revolves around the incorporated town of New Bloomfield and areas in the northern reaches of Holts Summit addresses around Lake Mykee. Cedar Township includes the streams of Fitzhugh Branch, Kelly Branch, Lawson Branch, Murphy Branch, Murray Branch, Riley Branch, Skunk Creek and Town Creek, and cemeteries named Boyce, Cason, King, Mount Zion, Perry, Prospect, Providence, Saint Paul and Sheley. Cedar Township is bordered to the north by Guthrie Township (incl Guthrie), to the east by Caldwell Township (incl Dixie), to the southeast by Cote Sans Dessein township (incl Tebbetts and the remains of the historic Effie and Cote Sans Dessein settlements). To the direct south and southwest of Cedar Township today are Summit Township (including Holts Summit and the southern frontier town of Cedar City now absorbed into Jefferson City).

== History ==
Cedar Township was established in 1824, and named after the Missouri River tributary Cedar Creek, which generally forms its western border with Boone County. At that time, it included what is now Summit Township (to its south), later separated around 1890.

Unfortunate confusion has arisen in historical and genealogical research from the fact that the nearby historic Missouri River shore town of Cedar City is no longer inside Cedar Township, but instead at the southern shoreline boundary of Summit Township, beyond Holts Summit, and since 1989 incorporated into the city limits of Jefferson City after its expansion northward across the Missouri River into Callaway County. To clarify 'the two Cedars' (both mentioned in historical and genealogical research) and changes over time, a historic map of Callaway County townships, where one can see both Cedar Township (hub in New Bloomfield, and north of the Summit Township created between 1883 and 1897) and Cedar City (at the far south of Summit Township but inside the former boundaries of Cedar Township) in detail can be found at http://cdm16795.contentdm.oclc.org/cdm/ref/collection/moplatbooks/id/656 . Historic maps often do not show the relatively new and short-lived Lake Mykee Town, located near the border between Cedar and Summit townships, and Lake Mykee was absorbed in 2017 into the city limits of Holts Summit, making Holts Summit extend from its Summit Township base across into southern Cedar Township.

(An additional complication of names in Callaway County townships is that the town of Auxvasse, Missouri, inland and near the northern boundary of the county, is not today within the boundaries of Auxvasse Township at the southern boundary of the county and on the Missouri River.)
