= Auxvasse Creek =

Stream in Missouri, U.S.

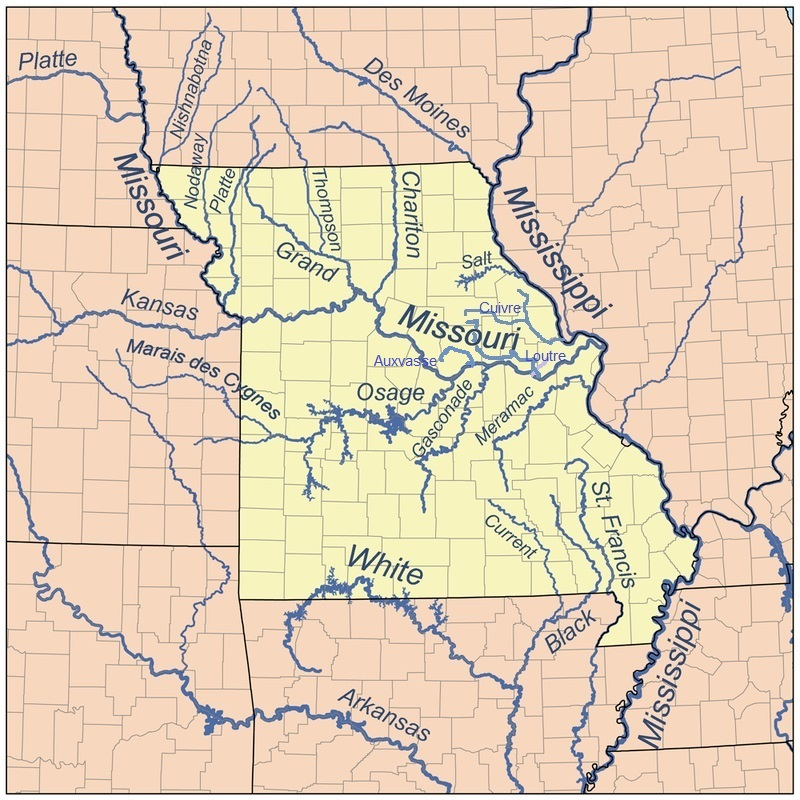

Auxvasse Creek is a stream in north and northeast Callaway County, Missouri. Auxvasse Creek is a tributary to the Missouri River.

The headwaters of the stream are at 38°57′25″N 92°03′57″W and the confluence with the Missouri is at 38°40′55″N 91°49′23″W. The source area for the stream lies just north of Interstate 70 west of the community of Eastville and the stream flows north turning east south of the community of Hatton. The stream gains the flow of Fourmile Branch and meanders to the east-southeast crossing under U.S. 54 between Auxvasse (becoming the town's namesake) to the north and Kingdom City to the south. The stream turns southeast and passes under I-70 just northeast of the community of Calwood. The stream flows southeast to south passing the community of Toledo and turns southwest after gaining the tributary of Cow Creek north of Reform. West of Reform the stream gains the waters of Crows Fork Creek and turns south flowing past the Reform Conservation Area. Just west of Steedman the stream enters the Missouri River floodplain and crosses Missouri Route 94, and the floodplain to join the Missouri west of Chamois.

Auxvasse is a name derived from French meaning "with mud".

== See also ==
- List of rivers of Missouri
