= Middle River (Missouri River tributary) =

Stream in the American state of Missouri

The Middle River is a stream in southwest Callaway County of central Missouri. It is a tributary to the Missouri River.

The stream headwaters arise at 38°54′25″N 92°03′54″W approximately 3.5 miles (5.6 km) east of Millersburg at an elevation of approximately 890 feet (270 m). The stream flows generally south-southeast passing about 3.5 miles (5.6 km) west of Fulton and passes under US Route 54 southwest of Fulton. It continues to the south-southeast and passes under Missouri Route 94 and into the Missouri River floodplain 2.5 miles (4.0 km) east of Tebbetts. The stream then meanders to the northeast for about two miles (3.2 km) before entering the Missouri River south of Mokane at 38°39′07″N 91°53′06″W and an elevation of 515 feet (157 m).
