= Liberty Township, Callaway County, Missouri =

Township in the American state of Missouri

Liberty Township
- Township
- Coordinates: 39°01′25″N 091°58′47″W
- Country: United States
- State: Missouri
- County: Callaway

Area
  - Total: 38.45 sq mi (99.58 km^{2})
  - Land: 38.3 sq mi (99.2 km^{2})
  - Water: 0.15 sq mi (0.38 km^{2}) 0.38%
- Elevation: 915 ft (279 m)

Population (2010)
  - Total: 840
  - Density: 22/sq mi (8.5/km^{2})
- FIPS code: 29-41996

Liberty Township is one of eighteen townships in Callaway County, Missouri, USA. As of the 2010 census, its population was 840.

== Geography ==
Liberty Township today covers an area of 38.45 square miles (99.6 km^{2}), and while containing no incorporated towns, does include the unincorporated settlements of Hatton and Concord. The township includes one cemetery, named Concord, plus the streams of Fourmile Branch and Leeper Branch which are tributaries of Auxvasse Creek to the south.

== History ==
Prior to the December 25, 1875 creation of Jackson Township, Liberty Township was much larger, and included the city of Auxvasse and the settlement of McCredie. This is significant for historical and genealogical research.

The map on the 2nd page of the atlas published in 1876 still shows the much larger Liberty Township boundaries, which had just been changed at the end of 1875. Whereas the map from 1930 shows a smaller Liberty Township, which appears to approximate today's boundaries.
