= Saint Aubert (disambiguation) =

Saint Aubert or Saint-Aubert may refer to:

== People ==
- Aubert of Avranches (died 720), bishop of Avranches

== Places ==
- Saint-Aubert, Quebec, Canada, a municipality
- Saint-Aubert, Nord, France, a commune
- Saint Aubert, Missouri, United States, an unincorporated community
- Mokane, Missouri, a city formerly called Saint Aubert

== See also ==
- St. Aubert Township, Callaway County, Missouri
- Saint-Aubert-sur-Orne, Orne, France
