= Readsville, Missouri =

Unincorporated community in Missouri, U.S.

Coordinates: 38°48′16″N 91°43′09″W

Readsville is an unincorporated community in southeastern Callaway County, in the U.S. state of Missouri. The community is located along Missouri Route D approximately six miles north of Portland and the Missouri River and seven miles south of Williamsburg and I-70. The community of Yucatan is three miles north along Route D.

== History ==
Readsville was settled in 1856 by John A. Read, for whom it was named. A post office was established at Readsville in 1856, and remained in operation until 1954.
