= Crows Fork Creek =

Stream in the U.S. state of Missouri

Crows Fork Creek is a stream in Callaway County in the U.S. state of Missouri. Crows Fork is a tributary to Auxvasse Creek. Crows Fork begins with the confluence of Maddox Branch with Richland Creek at 38°53′16″N 91°53′39″W northeast of Fulton. The stream flows south to southeast and enters Auxvasse Creek west of Reform at 38°47′10″N 91°51′46″W.

Crows Fork Creek was named after Jonathan Crow, a pioneer citizen.

== See also ==
- List of rivers of Missouri
