= Youngers, Missouri =

Unincorporated community in Missouri, U.S.

Coordinates: 39°03′04″N 92°07′29″W

Youngers is an unincorporated community in northwest Callaway County, in the U.S. state of Missouri. The community is in the extreme northwest corner of Callaway County and just east of Cedar Creek. Auxvasse is about twelve miles to the east, Mexico is about 14 miles to the northeast in Audrain County and Columbia is about nine miles to the southwest in Boone County.

== History ==
A post office called Youngers was established in 1862, and remained in operation until 1908. The community was named after Anderson Younger, the town merchant.
