= Summit Township, Callaway County, Missouri =

Township in the American state of Missouri

Summit Township
- Township
- Coordinates: 38°38′40″N 092°06′25″W
- Country: United States
- State: Missouri
- County: Callaway

Area
  - Total: 60.22 sq mi (155.96 km^{2})
  - Land: 58.6 sq mi (151.9 km^{2})
  - Water: 1.57 sq mi (4.07 km^{2}) 2.61%
- Elevation: 738 ft (225 m)

Population (2010)
  - Total: 8,873
  - Density: 151.3/sq mi (58.41/km^{2})
- FIPS code: 29-71548
- GNIS feature ID: 0766386

Summit Township is one of eighteen townships in Callaway County, Missouri, USA. As of the 2010 census, its population was 8,873.

== Geography ==
Summit Township as of 2018 covers an area of 60.22 square miles (156.0 km^{2}) and contains one incorporated settlement, Holts Summit. It contains the streams of Cedar Creek, Clifton Creek, Niemans Creek and Turkey Creek—and seven cemeteries: Bull, Harthill, Link, Meng, Mount Vernon, Stokes and Wallace. It also includes the former incorporated town of Cedar City, which was absorbed by Jefferson City in 1989, thus extending the boundaries of Cole County's Jefferson City into a small area of Callaway County along the Missouri River.

== History ==
Summit Township was created sometime between 1883 and June 1890 (per US Veterans Schedules of that date) from the southern half of what had since 1824 been a doubly-larger Cedar Township bounded on the south by the Missouri River. Maps showing this distinction can be found in the reference section of the article for Callaway County, Missouri. This means that Cedar City and Holts Summit had for about 65 years, since 1824, been inside the much larger boundaries of Cedar Township, but after Summit Township's creation were (and are) no longer so. Briefly, between 1821 and 1824, for about 3 years, the settlements of today's Cedar (New Bloomfield) and Summit (Holts Summit, Cedar City) townships were all part of a far, far larger historic Cote Sans Dessein township that covered the entire western half of Callaway County. This is significant for historical and genealogical research.

== Transportation ==
Summit Township contains one airport or landing strip, Jefferson City Memorial Airport.
