= Guthrie Township, Callaway County, Missouri =

Township in the American state of Missouri

Guthrie Township
- Township
- Coordinates: 38°46′03″N 092°07′18″W
- Country: United States
- State: Missouri
- County: Callaway

Area
  - Total: 19.7 sq mi (50.9 km^{2})
  - Land: 19.61 sq mi (50.78 km^{2})
  - Water: 0.046 sq mi (0.12 km^{2}) 0.24%
- Elevation: 761 ft (232 m)

Population (2010)
  - Total: 604
  - Density: 30.8/sq mi (11.9/km^{2})
- FIPS code: 29-29800
- GNIS feature ID: 0766378

This article is on the Guthrie Township. For information on the town of Guthrie, within the township, see Guthrie, Missouri.

Guthrie Township is one of eighteen townships in Callaway County, Missouri, USA. As of the 2010 census, its population was 604.

Guthrie Township has the name of a local family.

== History ==
The town of Guthrie was established in 1872 as 'Bigbee' and then renamed 'Guthrie' in 1874.(See Missouri State Historical Society page on Callaway County place names.) The larger Guthrie Township surrounding the town of the same name was created sometime between 1883 and 1897 from what was before then approximately the southern one-third of Round Prairie Township (reduced in size thereafter), plus a narrow adjacent strip of northern Cedar Township. This is critical to determining exact locations in historical and genealogical research.

== Geography ==
Guthrie Township covers an area of 19.65 square miles (50.9 km^{2}) and while containing no incorporated settlements, it does include the unincorporated community of Guthrie (named Bigbee at time of its establishment). The stream of Dry Fork runs through this township, where the removal of the Chicago & Alton Railroad tracks and station affected the community substantially, and the community was absorbed largely into the economy of nearby New Bloomfield in neighboring Cedar Township.
