= Fowler Creek =

River in Missouri

Fowler Creek is a stream in Boone County in the U.S. state of Missouri. It is a tributary of Cedar Creek, which in turn is a tributary of the Missouri River.

The stream headwaters arise just east of the Columbia regional airport at 38°48′49″N 92°12′57″W. It flows generally south passing through a portion of eastern eastern Boone County and enters Cedar Creek at the Callaway County line at 38°42′47″N 92°13′01″W.

It is named after the local Fowler family.
