= Richland Creek (Crows Fork Creek tributary) =

Stream in the U.S. state of Missouri

Richland Creek is a stream in Callaway County in the U.S. state of Missouri. It is a tributary of Crows Fork Creek. The stream headwaters arise just south of Interstate 70 north of the community of Earl at 38°57′25″N 92°02′44″W. The stream flows southeast and crosses under Missouri Route 54 north of Fulton and reaches its confluence with Maddox Branch to form Crows Fork Creek northeast of Fulton at 38°53′16″N 91°53′39″W.

Richland Creek was named for the richness of the soil along its course.

== See also ==
- List of rivers of Missouri
