= Bachelor Creek (Missouri) =

Stream in Missouri, U.S.

Coordinates: 38°59′14″N 91°39′43″W

Bachelor Creek is a stream in northeastern Callaway County, in the U.S. state of Missouri. It is a tributary of the Loutre River.

The stream headwaters arise northwest of the community of Bachelor at and it flows east to southeast past the north side of Whetstone Creek Conservation Area and south of Shamrock to its confluence with the Loutre River about one mile west of the Callaway-Montgomery county line at .

Bachelor Creek was named for two bachelors who briefly settled along its course.

== See also ==
- List of rivers of Missouri
