= Lake Mykee Town, Missouri =

Unincorporated community in Missouri, U.S.

- Unincorporated community
- Location of Lake Mykee Town, Missouri
- Coordinates: 38°40′35″N 92°06′05″W
- Country: United States
- State: Missouri
- County: Callaway

Area
  - Total: 0.25 sq mi (0.65 km^{2})
  - Land: 0.19 sq mi (0.49 km^{2})
  - Water: 0.062 sq mi (0.16 km^{2})
- Elevation: 824 ft (251 m)

Population (2010)
  - Total: 350
  - Estimate (2016): 354
  - Density: 1,800/sq mi (710/km^{2})
- Time zone: UTC-6 (Central (CST))
  - Summer (DST): UTC-5 (CDT)
- FIPS code: 29-39990
- GNIS feature ID: 2398382
- Website: www.lakemykee.com

Lake Mykee Town was a village in Callaway County, Missouri, United States. The village government dissolved on June 1, 2017, and the land area annexed into Holts Summit, Missouri. Because of this, Lake Mykee no longer exists, and the former village is now referred to as Holts Summit. The population was 350 at the 2010 census. It is part of the Jefferson City Metropolitan Statistical Area.

== Geography ==
According to the United States Census Bureau, the village has a total area of 0.25 square miles (0.65 km^{2}), of which, 0.19 square miles (0.49 km^{2}) of it is land and 0.06 square miles (0.16 km^{2}) is water.

Lake Mykee was developed by the Hasselman family on the site of their original farm. "Mykee" is an acronym for the names of their two sons.

The development of Lake Mykee resulted in the relocation of the expansion of Highway 54 east of the lake and dam in the 1970s from the route of Old Highway 54 to the current route in order to provide four lanes without cutting off the subdivision entrance and to avoid the lake.

== Demographics ==
Historical population
Census	Pop.	Note	%±
1980	188		—
1990	257		36.7%
2000	326		26.8%
2010	350		7.4%
2016 (est.)	354		1.1%
U.S. Decennial Census

In 2004, the 130-acre (0.53 km^{2}) parcel directly south of Lake Mykee owned by Delbert Payne and his family since 1928 began to be developed into a new, unrelated subdivision named Southwind Meadows. Streets for an initial plat of 24 lots were poured in late 2004 and early 2005 by Stockman Construction and accepted by Callaway County. By the end of 2007, five houses were substantially complete. By the time of the Great recession, houses had been built and occupied on 9 of the 24 lots. Between spring of 2017 and the end of 2019 an additional 10 homes were built. The subdivision has electricity and gas from Ameren, water from Callaway Water District #1, and a dedicated sewer treatment plant maintained by Missouri American Water.

=== 2010 census ===
As of the census of 2010, there were 350 people, 131 households, and 107 families residing in the village. The population density was 1,842.1 inhabitants per square mile (711.2/km^{2}). There were 135 housing units at an average density of 710.5 per square mile (274.3/km^{2}). The racial makeup of the village was 96.9% White, 0.6% African American, 0.9% Asian, and 1.7% from two or more races. Hispanic or Latino of any race were 1.4% of the population.

There were 131 households, of which 30.5% had children under the age of 18 living with them, 73.3% were married couples living together, 3.1% had a female householder with no husband present, 5.3% had a male householder with no wife present, and 18.3% were non-families. 14.5% of all households were made up of individuals, and 3.8% had someone living alone who was 65 years of age or older. The average household size was 2.67 and the average family size was 2.92.

The median age in the village was 43.7 years. 22% of residents were under the age of 18; 6.6% were between the ages of 18 and 24; 23.7% were from 25 to 44; 30.8% were from 45 to 64; and 16.9% were 65 years of age or older. The gender makeup of the village was 51.7% male and 48.3% female.

=== 2000 census ===
As of the census of 2000, there were 326 people, 117 households, and 104 families residing in the village. The population density was 1,672.2 inhabitants per square mile (645.6/km^{2}). There were 120 housing units at an average density of 615.5 per square mile (237.6/km^{2}). The racial makeup of the village was 96.32% White, 0.61% Asian, 1.84% from other races, and 1.23% from two or more races. Hispanic or Latino of any race were 3.37% of the population.

There were 117 households, out of which 37.6% had children under the age of 18 living with them, 77.8% were married couples living together, 7.7% had a female householder with no husband present, and 10.3% were non-families. 9.4% of all households were made up of individuals, and 3.4% had someone living alone who was 65 years of age or older. The average household size was 2.79 and the average family size was 2.96.

In the village, the population was spread out, with 27.3% under the age of 18, 6.7% from 18 to 24, 24.2% from 25 to 44, 30.4% from 45 to 64, and 11.3% who were 65 years of age or older. The median age was 39 years. For every 100 females, there were 110.3 males. For every 100 females age 18 and over, there were 99.2 males.

The median income for a household in the village was $56,667, and the median income for a family was $60,556. Males had a median income of $35,938 versus $28,750 for females. The per capita income for the village was $20,374. About 2.0% of families and 3.7% of the population were below the poverty line, including 2.1% of those under age 18 and 7.7% of those age 65 or over.
