= Dixie, Missouri =

Unincorporated community in Missouri, U.S.

Coordinates: 38°43′08″N 92°00′34″W

Dixie is an unincorporated community in southwestern Callaway County, in the U.S. state of Missouri. The community is located at the intersection of Missouri Routes BB and PP. It is on a ridge between Middle River to the east and Hillers Creek to the west. Jefferson City on the Missouri River lies 12 miles to the southwest.

== History ==
An early variant name was "Caldwell". A post office called Caldwell was established in 1880, the name was changed to Dixie in 1892, and the post office closed in 1905. The present name is after Dixie Caldwell, an early postmaster's daughter.
