= Shamrock, Missouri =

Unincorporated community in Missouri, U.S.

Coordinates: 39°00′10″N 91°41′40″W

Shamrock is an unincorporated community in Shamrock Township in the northeast corner of Callaway County, in the U.S. state of Missouri. The community is on Missouri Route B two miles west of the Loutre River. Auxvasse is ten miles to the west, Montgomery City is about nine miles east and Williamsburg is five miles south.

== History ==
The community was named after the shamrock, since a large share of the first settlers were natives of Ireland.

The village of Shamrock was given a regional post office 1833, which, except during 1861–63, remained in operation until 1954.

Its former post office successfully solicited orders for letters ('covers' in philatelic terminology) to be postmarked from there on St Patrick's Day, showing its 'Shamrock' postmark. These were sought in part by stamp collectors, but also Irish culture enthusiasts.
