= Wainwright, Missouri =

Unincorporated community in Missouri, U.S.

Coordinates: 38°35′03″N 92°04′01″W

Wainwright is an unincorporated community in southern Callaway County, in the U.S. state of Missouri. The community is on Missouri Route 94 on the north edge of the Missouri River valley. Jefferson City is six miles to the west. The Katy Trail passes through Wainwright at mile 137.6.

== History ==
A post office called Wainwright was established in 1893, and remained in operation until 1953. The community was named after a St. Louis entrepreneur.
