= East Fulton Township, Callaway County, Missouri =

Township in the American state of Missouri

East Fulton Township
- Township
- Coordinates: 38°51′12″N 091°55′48″W
- Country: United States
- State: Missouri
- County: Callaway

Area
  - Total: 67.04 sq mi (173.64 km^{2})
  - Land: 66.85 sq mi (173.13 km^{2})
  - Water: 0.20 sq mi (0.51 km^{2}) 0.29%
- Elevation: 791 ft (241 m)

Population (2010)
  - Total: 10,231
  - Density: 153.05/sq mi (59.094/km^{2})
- FIPS code: 29-20854
- GNIS feature ID: 0766377

East Fulton Township is one of eighteen townships in Callaway County, Missouri, USA. As of the 2010 census, its population was 10,231.

== History ==
The township was founded as Elizabeth Township on May 14, 1821, a few months after the initial creation of township districts in Callaway County and around the time of Missouri statehood. The county seat was a town called Elizabeth (not to be confused with nearby Saint Elizabeth in Miller County), about 6 miles southeast of Fulton, not far from the settlement of Hams Prairie. On February 7, 1825, the county seat was moved to Fulton, and the district was enlarged and renamed Fulton Township. Its boundaries stretched from a few miles north of Fulton to the Missouri River, and included what, around 1855, became Saint Aubert Township (including Mokane) and most of what became Caldwell Township in 1883. Over time, areas further north of Fulton, including the historic village of Callaway, were added to the unified, historical Fulton Township. The boundaries were changed again by 2000. Details of boundary changes can be found in the various official Callaway County Atlases, three of which are found in one volume and, individually, on the website of the State of Missouri Historical Society .

== Geography ==
East Fulton Township covers an area of 67.04 square miles (173.6 km^{2}) and contains the east portion of the city of Fulton (the county seat). It contains seven cemeteries: Dunlap, Guerrart, Hillcrest, Kibby, Muir, Southside and United Brethren.

The streams of Booth Branch, Cow Creek, Craghead Branch, Crows Fork Creek, Dunlap Creek, Rockhouse Creek, Smith Branch and Youngs Creek run through this township.
