= SoCal (disambiguation) =

SoCal may refer to several institutions and places in the USA:

Places:

- Southern California, the southern portion of the state of California.

Institutions:

- The University of Southern California, a private research university located in Los Angeles, California.
- Southern California TRACON, an air traffic control center for Southern California region under FAA.
- South Callaway High School, a public high school located in Mokane, Missouri.

Miscellaneous:

- So Cal, a clothing brand owned by No Fear, Inc., marketed especially to youth and California residents.
- Standard Oil of California (SOCal), the company today known as Chevron
- SoCal Val, American professional wrestling valet, ringside attendant, backstage interviewer, occasional ring announcer and TNA Knockout
