= Stephens, Missouri =

Unincorporated community in Missouri, U.S.

Coordinates: 38°58′39″N 92°07′52″W

Stephens is an unincorporated community in northwest Callaway County, in the U.S. state of Missouri. The community is one mile east of Cedar Creek and the Callaway-Boone county line. Lindbergh on I-70 lies 1.5 miles to the south.

== History ==
The community had a country store called Stephens Store. The store had the name of its owner, T. L. Stephens. A post office called Stephens Store was established in 1862, the name was changed to Stephens in 1912, and the post office closed in 1957.
