= Auxvasse Township, Callaway County, Missouri =

Township in the American state of Missouri

Auxvasse Township today
- Township
- Coordinates: 38°45′37″N 091°45′10″W
- Country: United States
- State: Missouri
- County: Callaway

Area
  - Total: 90.9 sq mi (235.4 km^{2})
  - Land: 89.20 sq mi (231.02 km^{2})
  - Water: 1.69 sq mi (4.38 km^{2}) 1.86%
- Elevation: 810 ft (247 m)

Population (2010)
  - Total: 1,000
  - Density: 11/sq mi (4.3/km^{2})
- FIPS code: 29-02656
- GNIS feature ID: 0766370

Auxvasse Township is one of eighteen townships in Callaway County, Missouri, USA. As of the 2010 census, its population was 1,000.

== History ==
Historical references to Auxvasse Township are complicated by the fact that, at the time of its founding on February 12, 1821, the Township was about 4 times larger than it is now, and included all of Callaway County east of Auxvasse Creek. The township as well as the city of Auxvasse are both named after Auxvasse Creek. Today's city of Auxvasse is not within today's borders of Auxvasse Township, although the city was near the northwest border of the Auxvasse Township of the early 1800s, which extended all the way north to what is now the Audrain-Callaway county line. Auxvasse Township was reduced gradually to its current size by 1826, first by the creation of (then larger and including Shamrock, Calwood, and part of Jackson) Nine Mile Prairie Township to the north of current boundaries. The city of Auxvasse is located about 15 miles to the north-northwest of Auxvasse Township, and about 3 miles from Callaway County's northern border with Audrain County.

== Geography ==
Auxvasse Township today (as of 2018) covers an area of 90.89 square miles (235.4 km^{2}) and, although containing no incorporated settlements, does contain the unincorporated settlements of Portland, Readsville, and Reform, as well as eastern Steedman along its border with St Aubert Township. The historic town of Heilburn bordered Portland. Auxvasse Township contains nine cemeteries: Atterberry, Garrett, Holiness, Lawrence, Liberty, Old Salem, Oliver, Saint Patricks and Washington—and the streams of Eagle Creek, Little Tavern Creek, Logan Camp Branch, Logan Creek, Means Branch, Meyers Branch, Mollie Dozier Chute, Mud Creek and Tavern Creek.

The Missouri River forms its southern border, while to its west is St Aubert Township (incl Mokane), to its northwest is East Fulton Township (incl Fulton), to its north is Nine Mile Prairie Township (incl Williamsburg), and to its east is Montgomery County. Do not confuse today's Auxvasse Township with city of Auxvasse, Missouri in Jackson Township, about 15 to 20 miles to the north-northwest.
