= Guthrie Township =

Guthrie Township may refer to the following townships in the United States:

- Guthrie Township, Lawrence County, Indiana
- Guthrie Township, Hubbard County, Minnesota
- Guthrie Township, Callaway County, Missouri
