= Bourbon Township =

Bourbon Township may refer to the following townships in the United States:

- Bourbon Township, Douglas County, Illinois
- Bourbon Township, Marshall County, Indiana
- Bourbon Township, Boone County, Missouri
- Bourbon Township, Callaway County, Missouri
