= North Callaway High School =

Coordinates: 38°57′39″N 91°55′09″W

Location
- 2700 Thunderbird Dr; Kingdom City, (Callaway County), Missouri 65262; United States

Information
- Type: Public high school
- Founded: 1965; 61 years ago
- School district: North Callaway R-1 School District
- Principal: Travis Blevins
- Teaching staff: 28.35 (FTE)
- Grades: 9–12
- Enrollment: 343 (2023–2024)
- Student to teacher ratio: 12.10
- Colors: Green and black
- Athletics conference: Eastern Missouri Conference
- Mascot: Thunderbird
- Website: Official website

North Callaway High School is a public high school in Kingdom City, Missouri, United States.

== Students ==
There are 91 freshmen, 87 sophomore, 100 junior, and 80 senior students (2021-2022).
