= Boydsville =

Boydsville may refer to one of the following places in the United States:

- Boydsville, Kentucky and Tennessee
- Boydsville, Missouri
