= New Bloomfield =

New Bloomfield may refer to:

- New Bloomfield, Missouri, a town in Callaway County
- New Bloomfield, Pennsylvania, a borough in Perry County
