= Concord, Missouri (disambiguation) =

Concord, Missouri is a census-designated place in St. Louis County.

Concord, Missouri may also refer to:

- Concord, Callaway County, Missouri, an unincorporated community
- Concord, Pemiscot County, Missouri, an unincorporated community

== See also ==
- Concord (disambiguation)
