= Richland Christian Church =

Historic church in Missouri, United States

- U.S. National Register of Historic Places
- Location within Missouri Location within the United States
- Location: 5301 Callaway Cty. Rd. 220, Kingdom City, Missouri
- Coordinates: 38°55′52″N 91°59′33″W
- Area: less than one acre
- Built: 1873
- Built by: Wiggs & Russell
- Architectural style: Italianate
- NRHP reference No.: 01000122
- Added to NRHP: February 16, 2001

Richland Christian Church is a historic Disciples of Christ church located at Kingdom City, Callaway County, Missouri. It was built in 1873, and is a one-story, rectangular, three bay, frame building with Italianate style design elements. It has a front gable roof and rests on eight stone piers. Also on the property is a contributing outhouse.

It was listed on the National Register of Historic Places in 2001.
