= Whetstone Creek =

Whetstone Creek may refer to:

- Whetstone Creek (Gasconade River tributary), a stream in Missouri
- Whetstone Creek (Loutre River tributary), a stream in Missouri
- Whetstone Creek (Little Nottoway River tributary), a stream in Nottoway County, Virginia
- Whetstone Creek (Olentangy River tributary), a stream in Ohio
