= Calwood Township, Callaway County, Missouri =

Township in the American state of Missouri

Calwood Township
- Township
- Coordinates: 38°53′29″N 091°50′31″W
- Country: United States
- State: Missouri
- County: Callaway

Area
  - Total: 44.17 sq mi (114.41 km^{2})
  - Land: 43.99 sq mi (113.94 km^{2})
  - Water: 0.18 sq mi (0.47 km^{2}) 0.41%
- Elevation: 801 ft (244 m)

Population (2010)
  - Total: 1,097
  - Density: 24.94/sq mi (9.628/km^{2})
- FIPS code: 29-10666
- GNIS feature ID: 0766373

Calwood Township is one of eighteen townships in Callaway County, Missouri, United States. As of the 2010 census, its population was 1,097.

== History ==
Calwood Township was established February 23, 1876, carved out of the southwestern sector of a heretofore larger Nine Mile Prairie Township, and named after the community of Calwood, Missouri.

Calwood was formerly known as "Moore's Mill", since a steam mill owned by Moore was located there. The Civil War Battle of Moore's Mill was fought nearby in 1862.

== Geography ==
Calwood Township covers an area of 44.17 square miles (114.4 km^{2}) and contains no incorporated settlements. It contains one cemetery, Fairview.

The streams of Dyers Branch, Harrison Branch, Houfs Branch, Maddox Branch, Pinch Creek and Richland Creek run through this township.
