= Dry Fork (Cedar Creek tributary) =

River in Missouri, United States

Coordinates: 38°45′54″N 92°09′46″W

Dry Fork is a stream in Callaway County in the U.S. state of Missouri. It is a tributary of Cedar Creek.

Dry Fork was named for its tendency to run dry.

== See also ==
- List of rivers of Missouri
