= West Fulton Township, Callaway County, Missouri =

Township in the American state of Missouri

West Fulton Township
- Township
- Coordinates: 38°51′07″N 091°58′00″W
- Country: United States
- State: Missouri
- County: Callaway

Area
  - Total: 25.47 sq mi (65.96 km^{2})
  - Land: 25.31 sq mi (65.56 km^{2})
  - Water: 0.15 sq mi (0.39 km^{2}) 0.59%
- Elevation: 827 ft (252 m)

Population (2010)
  - Total: 7,269
  - Density: 287.2/sq mi (110.9/km^{2})
- FIPS code: 29-78766
- GNIS feature ID: 0766387

West Fulton Township is one of eighteen townships in Callaway County, Missouri, USA. As of the 2010 census, its population was 7,269.

== History ==
West Fulton Township was formed from a western section of historic Fulton Township in the 2000s. The remainder of Fulton Township was later renamed East Fulton Township. For a history of the unified Fulton Township, see East Fulton Township.

== Geography ==
West Fulton Township covers an area of 25.47 square miles (66.0 km^{2}) and contains the west portion of the city of Fulton (the county seat). It contains two cemeteries: Callaway Memorial Gardens and Wright.

== Transportation ==
West Fulton Township contains one airport or landing strip, Fulton Municipal Airport.
