= Oakley Chapel African Methodist Episcopal Church =

Historic church in Missouri, United States

- U.S. National Register of Historic Places
- Location within Missouri Location within the United States
- Location: County Road 485 at the County Road 486 junction, Tebbetts, Missouri
- Coordinates: 38°37′51″N 91°57′49″W
- Area: 1 acre (0.40 ha)
- Built: 1878
- Architectural style: Gable Front Church
- NRHP reference No.: 08001192
- Added to NRHP: December 17, 2008

Oakley Chapel African Methodist Episcopal Church is a historic African Methodist Episcopal church located at Tebbetts, Callaway County, Missouri. It was built in 1878, and is a one-story, frame gable front church on a concrete foundation. Also on the property are the contributing small cistern (c. 1900) and cemetery. There are approximately 80 known burials in the cemetery.

It was listed on the National Register of Historic Places in 2008.
