= Saint Aubert, Missouri =

Unincorporated community in Missouri, United States

Coordinates: 38°39′00″N 91°51′24″W

Saint Aubert is an unincorporated community in Osage County, in the U.S. state of Missouri. Variant names were "Medora" and "Shipleys Landing".

== History ==
Saint Aubert was originally called Medora, and under the latter name was platted in 1855, and named after Medora Morrow, the wife of a first settler. A post office called Medora was established in 1858, the name was changed to Saint Aubert in 1893, and the post office closed in 1935. The present name is a transfer from St. Aubert Township, Callaway County, Missouri.
