= Bachelor, Missouri =

Unincorporated community in Missouri, U.S.

Coordinates: 38°59′36″N 91°46′20″W

Bachelor is an unincorporated community in northern Callaway County, in the U.S. state of Missouri. The community is on Missouri Route A, approximately six miles east-southeast of Auxvasse. The headwaters of Bachelor Creek are to the northwest of the community.

== History ==
A post office called Bachelor was established in 1875, and remained in operation until 1959. The community was named after Bachelor Creek.
