= Guthrie, Missouri =

Unincorporated community in Missouri, US

Coordinates: 38°45′25″N 92°05′48″W

Guthrie is an unincorporated community in western Callaway County, in the U.S. state of Missouri. The community lies at the intersection of Missouri routes J and Y. New Bloomfield lies two miles south on Route J and the Pine Ridge Recreation Area of the Mark Twain National Forest along Cedar Creek is four miles west on Route Y.

== History ==
Guthrie was originally called Bigbee, and under the latter name was laid out in 1872 by B. S. Bigbee. The present name is after John and Samuel N. Guthrie, early citizens. A post office called Bigbee was established in 1872, the name was changed to Guthrie in 1874, and the post office closed in 1954.
