= Cleveland Township, Callaway County, Missouri =

Township in the American state of Missouri

Cleveland Township
- Township
- Coordinates: 39°00′02″N 092°05′46″W
- Country: United States
- State: Missouri
- County: Callaway

Area
  - Total: 26.19 sq mi (67.82 km^{2})
  - Land: 26.04 sq mi (67.44 km^{2})
  - Water: 0.15 sq mi (0.38 km^{2}) 0.56%
- Elevation: 915 ft (279 m)

Population (2010)
  - Total: 742
  - Density: 28.5/sq mi (11.0/km^{2})
- FIPS code: 29-14752
- GNIS feature ID: 0766375

Cleveland Township is one of eighteen townships in Callaway County, Missouri, USA. As of the 2010 census, its population was 742.

== History ==
Cleveland Township was created sometime between 1883 and 1897 from the northern sector Bourbon Township as previously defined, and named after President Grover Cleveland. As can be seen from the 1930 map of Callaway townships, at some point after 1930 the southeastern corner of Cleveland Township reverted to become part of Bourbon Township again. Its boundaries are illustrated in the maps linked below.

== Geography ==
Cleveland Township covers an area of 26.18 square miles (67.8 km^{2}) and contains the historic unincorporated settlements of Stephens and Younger, plus rural homes, but no incorporated settlements as of 2018. Its western boundary is Cedar Creek, with Boone County beyond it. The township contains four cemeteries: Allen, Oak, Simpson and Youngers, and the stream of Manacle Creek runs through this township.
