= New Bloomfield, Missouri =

- City
- Location of New Bloomfield, Missouri
- Coordinates: 38°43′01″N 92°05′29″W
- Country: United States
- State: Missouri
- County: Callaway

Government
  - Mayor: Terry Shaw

Area
  - Total: 1.57 sq mi (4.07 km^{2})
  - Land: 1.54 sq mi (4.00 km^{2})
  - Water: 0.027 sq mi (0.07 km^{2})
- Elevation: 869 ft (265 m)

Population (2020)
  - Total: 687
  - Density: 444.6/sq mi (171.67/km^{2})
- Time zone: UTC-6 (Central (CST))
  - Summer (DST): UTC-5 (CDT)
- ZIP code: 65063
- Area code: 573
- FIPS code: 29-51680
- GNIS feature ID: 2395185
- Website: City website

New Bloomfield is a city in Cedar Township, Callaway County, Missouri, United States. As of the 2020 census, New Bloomfield had a population of 687. It is part of the Jefferson City Metropolitan Statistical Area.

== History ==
In 1827, a 'Round Prairie Post Office' was opened northwest of New Bloomfield, near what became Guthrie almost 50 years later, and near the southern border of a much larger historic Round Prairie Township (subdivided around 1890 to create what then became the northern portion of Guthrie Township).

In 1836, a historic town of 'Bloomfield', next to or containing the Round Prairie Post Office, was first surveyed.

In 1841, the Round Prairie Post Office was shut down and moved about 1/2 mile southward, clearly into Cedar Township, and was renamed 'New Bloomfield Post Office', around which today's town of New Bloomfield formed. The official establishment of the town of Guthrie as 'Bigbee' and a new Guthrie Post Office (closed in 1954) followed in 1872 and 1874. The Chicago & Alton Railroad went from the Missouri riverport at Cedar City, through Holts Summit, then New Bloomfield and Guthrie, then veered northeast toward Carrington, then Fulton, then McCredie, Auxvasse, and into Audrain County and the city of Mexico, and thereafter toward Illinois and Chicago to the east, or to Kansas City to the west. Connection to St Louis was made via locations across the Mississippi River in Illinois until the MKT railroad was built in the 1890s. A ferry boat connected the Cedar City railway station to Jefferson City until a bridge was built in 1896. The New Bloomfield railroad station was located in what is now the New Bloomfield City Park. Details of relevant township boundary changes are given in the articles on both Round Prairie Township and Cedar Township.

== Historical summary ==
- 1821: State of Missouri admitted to Union.
- 1827: Round Prairie Post Office opened northwest of New Bloomfield, near Guthrie.
- 1836: Historical town of 'Bloomfield', built around Round Prairie Post Office, first surveyed.
- 1841: Round Prairie Post Office shut down and moved to near current location in what is now New Bloomfield.
- 1867: First New Bloomfield School inside city limits.
- 1872: Chicago & Alton Railway station in New Bloomfield opens.
- 1872: Town of Guthrie founded as 'Bigbee'.
- 1874: Guthrie Post Office opened.
- 1890 circa: Township boundaries change. Guthrie Township formed from northern strip of Cedar and southern part of Round Prairie townships. Summit Township formed from southern half of Cedar Township (including Holts Summit and Cedar city; leaving New Bloomfield still in Cedar Township).
- 1896: Missouri River bridge connects New Bloomfield and Callaway County to Jefferson City.
- 1904: Long distance telephone service available in New Bloomfield.
- 1917: New Bloomfield School rebuilt following fire destroying former building.
- 1954: Guthrie Post Office shut down.
- 1956: New gymnasium added to New Bloomfield School.
- 1959: New Bloomfield incorporated as a city.
- 1961: New Bloomfield Post Office moved into new building next door.
- 1965: New and separate elementary school opened in January for elementary grades, special education, library, and music room. High school remained in 1917 building.
- 1983: New US Highway 54 reroutes traffic to area east of New Bloomfield; old Hwy 54 becomes State Road AE.

== Geography ==
New Bloomfield is located along U.S. Route 54. Town Creek flows past the east side of the city and Hillers Creek is about two miles to the east.

According to the United States Census Bureau, the city has a total area of 1.56 square miles (4.04 km^{2}), of which 1.53 square miles (3.96 km^{2}) is land and 0.03 square miles (0.08 km^{2}) is water.

== Demographics ==
Historical population
Census	Pop.	Note	%±
1960	359		—
1970	427		18.9%
1980	519		21.5%
1990	480		−7.5%
2000	599		24.8%
2010	669		11.7%
2020	687		2.7%
U.S. Decennial Census

=== 2010 census ===
As of the census of 2010, there were 669 people, 256 households, and 173 families living in the city. The population density was 437.3 inhabitants per square mile (168.8/km^{2}). There were 283 housing units at an average density of 185.0 per square mile (71.4/km^{2}). The racial makeup of the city was 94.2% White, 1.0% African American, 0.9% Native American, 0.6% Asian, 0.7% from other races, and 2.5% from two or more races. Hispanic or Latino of any race were 1.2% of the population.

There were 256 households, of which 37.9% had children under the age of 18 living with them, 52.0% were married couples living together, 12.5% had a female householder with no husband present, 3.1% had a male householder with no wife present, and 32.4% were non-families. 26.2% of all households were made up of individuals, and 9.8% had someone living alone who was 65 years of age or older. The average household size was 2.61 and the average family size was 3.15.

The median age in the city was 34.2 years. 27.4% of residents were under the age of 18; 8.3% were between the ages of 18 and 24; 30.5% were from 25 to 44; 24.5% were from 45 to 64; and 9.3% were 65 years of age or older. The gender makeup of the city was 49.0% male and 51.0% female.

=== 2000 census ===
As of the census in 2000, there were 599 people, 237 households, and 158 families living in the city. The population density was 1,261.3 inhabitants per square mile (487.0/km^{2}). There were 253 housing units at an average density of 532.8 per square mile (205.7/km^{2}). The racial makeup of the city was 96.49% White, 0.50% African American, 0.83% Native American, 0.33% Asian, and 1.84% from two or more races. Hispanic or Latino of any race were 0.83% of the population.

There were 237 households, out of which 41.4% had children under the age of 18 living with them, 50.6% were married couples living together, 15.2% had a female householder with no husband present, and 33.3% were non-families. 31.2% of all households were made up of individuals, and 16.0% had someone living alone who was 65 years of age or older. The average household size was 2.53 and the average family size was 3.20.

In the city the population was spread out, with 30.7% under the age of 18, 6.2% from 18 to 24, 34.6% from 25 to 44, 17.0% from 45 to 64, and 11.5% who were 65 years of age or older. The median age was 33 years. For every 100 females, there were 78.3 males. For every 100 females age 18 and over, there were 79.7 males.

The median income for a household in the city was $32,969, and the median income for a family was $41,023. Males had a median income of $25,556 versus $23,125 for females. The per capita income for the city was $15,180. About 6.5% of families and 9.1% of the population were below the poverty line, including 13.1% of those under age 18 and 13.0% of those age 65 or over.

== Education ==
It is in the New Bloomfield R-III School District.
