= Steedman, Missouri =

Unincorporated community in Missouri, U.S.

Coordinates: 38°42′17″N 91°49′05″W

Steedman in September 2026

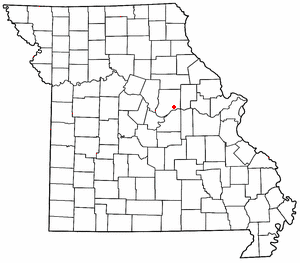

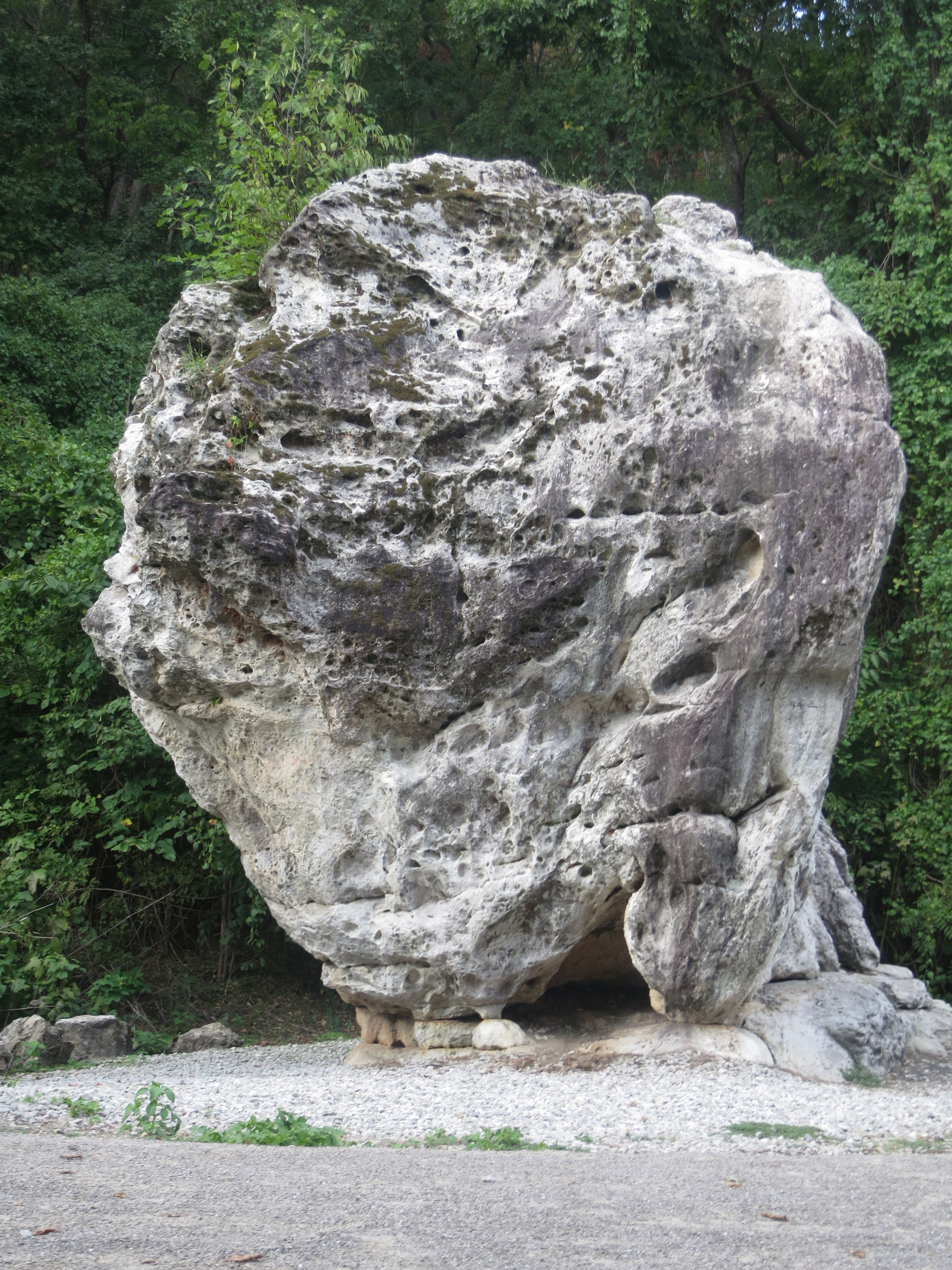
Standing Rock in Steedman

Steedman is an unincorporated community in southeastern Callaway County in the U.S. state of Missouri. The community is located on Missouri Route CC and Missouri Route 94 between Portland to the east and Mokane to the west above the Missouri River floodplain.

== History ==
A post office called Steedman has been in operation since 1894. The community was named after I. G. W. Steedman, the original owner of the town site.
