= South Callaway High School =

Location
- 10135 State Road C Mokane, Missouri 65059; United States; 38°41′14″N 91°53′31″W

Information
- School type: Public high school
- Established: 1959
- Principal: Heather Helsel
- Teaching staff: 22.75 (FTE)
- Enrollment: 237 (2023-2024)
- Student to teacher ratio: 10.42
- Colors: Royal blue and white
- Mascot: Cha-Cha the Bulldog
- Nickname: Bulldogs
- Website: www.sc.k12.mo.us/page/high-school

South Callaway R-II High School, most commonly known as South Callaway High School, South Callaway, SoCal, or SCHS, is a public high school located in Mokane, Missouri, United States. It provides education for students in grades 9–12. The school is part of the South Callaway R-II School District, all located on the same campus in Mokane, and is the only high school in the district. The school colors are blue and white. The school was opened in 1959.

== Athletics ==
The SCHS athletic teams are known as the Bulldogs, with girls' teams occasionally styled "Lady Bulldogs", most often in basketball. These teams, as well as the quiz bowl and speech teams, are members of the Eastern Missouri Conference, along with Tipton, North Callaway, Southern Boone, Harrisburg, and Hallsville.

Sports currently offered at South Callaway include the following. Class and district numbers are provided for those sports sanctioned by MSHSAA:

=== Seasons ===
- Fall
  - Football - Class 2, District 5
  - Softball - Class 2, District 10
  - Cross Country - Class 2, District 3
  - Cheerleading
  - Drill Team
- Winter
  - Basketball - Class 3, District 8
  - Cheerleading
  - Drill Team
- Spring
  - Baseball - Class 2, District 8
  - Track and Field - Class 2, District 3
  - Golf - Class 2, District 5
  - Cheerleading

=== Track and field ===
The state Senate honored South Callaway's Eric Frazee for his first-place finish in the 300 meter intermediate hurdles at the state track meet in Jefferson City on May 17, 2008. Frazee is the first state champion, at any sport, from the school since its establishment.
