= Jefferson City metropolitan area =

Metropolitan area in Missouri, United States

Jefferson City, Missouri Metropolitan Area Columbia-Jefferson City-Moberly, MO CSA
- Metropolitan Statistical Area
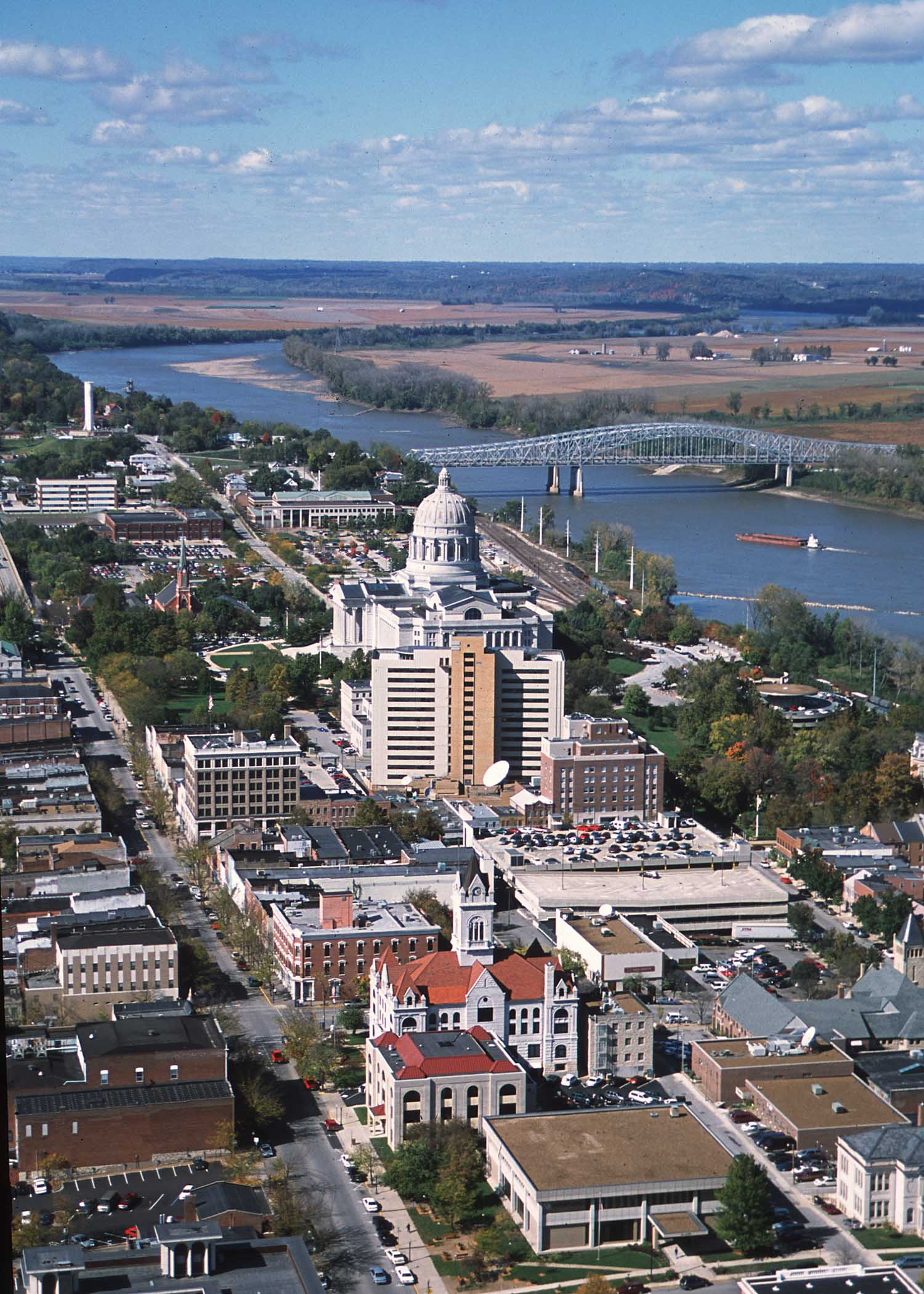
- Jefferson City and Missouri State Capitol
- Motto: Jefferson City
- Columbia Combined Statistical Area
- Country: United States
- State: Missouri
- Largest city: Columbia, Missouri
- Other cities: List: Jefferson City, Missouri; Moberly, Missouri; Mexico, Missouri; Boonville, Missouri
- Counties: List: In CSA: Boone County, Missouri; Audrain County, Missouri; Randolph County, Missouri; Cooper County, Missouri; Howard County, Missouri; Cole County, Missouri; Callaway County, Missouri; Moniteau County, Missouri; Osage County, Missouri

Population (2022)
  - MSA: 214,630 (216th)
  - CSA: 414,036 (102nd)
- Time zone: UTC−6 (CST)
  - Summer (DST): UTC−5 (CDT)
- Area codes: 573, 660

The Jefferson City metropolitan statistical area, as defined by the United States Census Bureau, is an area consisting of four counties – Cole, Callaway, Moniteau, and Osage – in central Missouri, anchored by the city of Jefferson City. As of the 2020 census, the MSA had a population of 150,316. The Jefferson City MSA is part of the broader Columbia–Jefferson City–Moberly combined statistical area.

== Counties ==
County	Seat	2025 estimate	2020 Census	Change	Area	Density
Cole	Jefferson City	77,908	77,279	+0.81%	402 sq mi (1,040 km^{2})	194/sq mi (75/km^{2})
Callaway	Fulton	45,765	44,283	+3.35%	847 sq mi (2,190 km^{2})	54/sq mi (21/km^{2})
Moniteau	California	15,428	15,473	−0.29%	419 sq mi (1,090 km^{2})	37/sq mi (14/km^{2})
Osage	Linn	13,611	13,274	+2.54%	611 sq mi (1,580 km^{2})	22/sq mi (9/km^{2})
Total		152,712	150,309	+1.60%	2,279 sq mi (5,900 km^{2})	67/sq mi (26/km^{2})

Historical population
Census	Pop.	Note	%±
1990	120,704		—
2000	140,052		16.0%
2010	149,807		7.0%
2020	150,316		0.3%
U.S. Decennial Census

== Communities ==
The following are cities, towns, and villages in the Jefferson City, MO Metropolitan Statistical Area categorized based on the United States Census Bureau 2025 population estimates. No population estimates are released for census-designated places (CDPs), which are marked with an asterisk (*). These places are categorized based on their 2020 Census population.

=== Places with more than 15,000 inhabitants ===
- Jefferson City (Principal city) (42,489)

=== Places with 1,000 to 15,000 inhabitants ===
- Fulton (12,853)
- Holts Summit (4,773)
- California (4,523)
- Tipton (2,766)
- Wardsville (1,667)
- Linn (1,453)
- Belle (partial) (1,379)
- St. Martins (1,242)
- Taos (1,175)
- Auxvasse (1,029)

=== Places with fewer than 1,000 inhabitants ===
- Russellville (806)
- New Bloomfield (747)
- Bland (partial) (505)
- Freeburg (407)
- Westphalia (404)
- Chamois (387)
- Jamestown (332)
- Centertown (292)
- Clarksburg (257)
- St. Thomas (231)
- Mokane (188)
- Meta (182)
- Lohman (177)
- Argyle (partial) (145)
- Eugene* (140)
- Kingdom City (135)
- Fortuna* (130)
- Latham* (69)
- Tebbetts* (64)
- Lupus (31)

=== Unincorporated places ===
- Bonnots Mill
- Cedar City
- Elston
- Folk
- Frankenstein
- Henley
- High Point
- Koeltztown
- Loose Creek
- McGirk
- Portland
- Rich Fountain
- Williamsburg

== Demographics ==
As of the census of 2000, there were 140,052 people, 51,637 households, and 35,569 families residing within the MSA. The racial makeup of the MSA was 90.12% White, 7.12% African American, 0.38% Native American, 0.64% Asian, 0.03% Pacific Islander, 0.52% from other races, and 1.19% from two or more races. Hispanic or Latino of any race were 1.29% of the population.

The median income for a household in the MSA was $39,692, and the median income for a family was $46,720. Males had a median income of $29,922 versus $22,678 for females. The per capita income for the MSA was $17,900.

== See also ==
- Missouri census statistical areas
- List of cities in Missouri
- List of villages in Missouri
