= Hereford, Missouri =

Unincorporated community in Missouri, U.S.

Coordinates: 38°59′30″N 92°05′38″W

Hereford is an unincorporated community in northwest Callaway County, in the U.S. state of Missouri. The community is on Missouri Route DD 2.5 miles north of I-70.

== History ==
A post office called Hereford was established in 1898, and remained in operation until 1907. The community was named after the Hereford cattle near the site.
