= Callaway, Missouri =

Unincorporated community in Missouri, U.S.

Coordinates: 38°54′55″N 91°57′03″W

Callaway is an unincorporated community in Callaway County, Missouri. The community was located approximately two miles south of Kingdom City and just west of U.S. Route 54. The site was on the Chicago and Alton Railroad and on the north bank of Richland Creek.

== History ==
A post office called Callaway was established in 1894, and remained in operation until 1906. The community takes its name from Callaway County.
