= Nine Mile Prairie Township, Callaway County, Missouri =

Township in the American state of Missouri

Nine Mile Prairie Township today
- Township
- Coordinates: 38°54′22″N 091°42′42″W
- Country: United States
- State: Missouri
- County: Callaway

Area
  - Total: 73.44 sq mi (190.21 km^{2})
  - Land: 72.97 sq mi (188.98 km^{2})
  - Water: 0.47 sq mi (1.23 km^{2}) 0.65%
- Elevation: 830 ft (253 m)

Population (2010)
  - Total: 790
  - Density: 11/sq mi (4.2/km^{2})
- FIPS code: 29-52508
- GNIS feature ID: 0766382

Nine Mile Prairie Township is one of eighteen townships in Callaway County, Missouri, USA. As of the 2010 census, its population was 790.

Nine Mile Prairie Township was named for a 9-mile (14 km) long prairie located within its borders.

== Geography ==
Nine Mile Prairie Township covers an area of 73.44 square miles (190.2 km^{2}) while containing no incorporated towns, includes the unincorporated community of Williamsburg, plus rural homes. Within its boundaries are six cemeteries: Allen, Antioch, Gregory, Oak Grove, Tate and Whitehead; and the streams of Bragg Branch, Bull Branch and Clarks Branch run through this township.

== History ==
Nine Mile Prairie Township, bordered by Montgomery County to the east, was created May 15, 1821 from what had been approximately the northern 2/3 of the much larger historic Auxvasse Township that covered all of eastern Callaway County in its early history. Around 1875, Nine Mile Prairie was reduced in the northwest by the creation of Jackson Township, followed by the creation of Calwood Township from its west central sector in 1876, and finally the loss of land to the new Shamrock Township between 1883 and 1897. The township revolves today primarily around the Williamsburg community.

== Transportation ==
Nine Mile Prairie Township contains one airport or landing strip, Eckerts Airstrip.
