= James Callaway =

Capt. James Richard Callaway (1783–1815) was an officer in the Missouri Rangers during the War of 1812. He was a grandson of Daniel Boone, nephew of Nathan Boone and grand-nephew of Richard Callaway.

== Birth and early life ==
James Callaway, was born in Kentucky September 13, 1783 to Flanders Callaway and Jemima Boone, Daniel Boone's daughter. In 1798 his family moved to Missouri. He returned to Kentucky in 1799 to complete his education.

After returning to Missouri, he married the former Nancy Howell in 1805, and they settled in Howell's prairie, in what is now St. Charles County, where he built a home.

Callaway and his wife had three children who were born in St. Charles County, Missouri: Thomas Howell Callaway (1806–1832), William Boone Callaway (1807–1869) and Theresa Etaline Callaway Schneider (1811–1886).

Callaway was involved in the fur trade and local business. He was a deputy sheriff in St. Charles County for several years, as well as collected taxes.

== Military service and death ==
Callaway was appointed Cornet of a troop of Missouri Rangers in 1808. He was promoted to captain in 1812, and the following year raised a company, for either the ongoing conflicts with indigenous people or the War of 1812 (accounts differ.) He participated in the expedition of General Howard in 1813 and the Battle of Credit Island in 1814 in a military capacity. Callaway was killed in battle with Native Americans near Loutre Creek in March 1815. He was buried by his father where he had been killed in what is now Montgomery County, Missouri.

== In memoriam ==
Callaway County, Missouri, was organized in 1820 and named in honor of Capt. Callaway.

Around 1904, Rev. W. H. Burnham began raising money to erect a monument in Callaway's honor. A 14-foot bronze memorial was erected in the courthouse yard in Fulton, Missouri, and dedicated in July 1905. The monument cost between $500-$600 in 1905 (approximately $17,141-$20,803 in 2023 dollars).

In 1912, Willam Bocks Rigg (1874–1964) published a book of poetry that included stanzas leading to the death of Callaway.

"The Kingdom Post No. 210 of the American legion on July 13, 1941, erected and dedicated markers for the graves of three soldiers slain with Captain James Callaway by Indians on Loutre creek, Montgomery county, March 7, 1815. The Federal government co-operated in furnishing the stones for the graves.—Fulton Daily Sun-Gazette, July 10, 1941."
