= Fulton 58 School District =

School district in Missouri, U.S.

Address
- 2 Hornet Drive Fulton, Missouri, 65251; United States

District information
- Type: Public
- Grades: PreK–12
- NCES District ID: 2912550

Students and staff
- Students: 2,227
- Teachers: 170.25
- Staff: 208.42
- Student–teacher ratio: 13.08

Other information
- Website: www.fulton58.org

Fulton 58 School District (FPS) is a school district headquartered in Fulton, Missouri.

The district, in Callaway County, includes almost all of Fulton.

As of 2019 the district had about 2,200 students.

== Schools ==
- Fulton High School
- Fulton Middle School
- Bartley Elementary School
- Bush Elementary School
- McIntire Elementary School
- Fulton Early Childhood Center
