= Carrington, Missouri =

Unincorporated community in Missouri, U.S.

Coordinates: 38°48′29″N 92°03′35″W

Carrington is an unincorporated community in Callaway County, in the U.S. state of Missouri. The community is on Missouri Route H approximately four miles west-southwest of Fulton. It is on the boundary of a section of the Mark Twain National Forest.

== History ==
Carrington was laid out in 1872 by William Carrington, and named for him. A post office called Carrington was established in 1873, and remained in operation until 1954.
