= St. Aubert Township, Callaway County, Missouri =

Township in the American state of Missouri

Saint Aubert Township
- Township
- Coordinates: 38°43′31″N 091°53′49″W
- Country: United States
- State: Missouri
- County: Callaway

Area
  - Total: 57.36 sq mi (148.55 km^{2})
  - Land: 56.65 sq mi (146.71 km^{2})
  - Water: 0.71 sq mi (1.84 km^{2}) 1.24%
- Elevation: 725 ft (221 m)

Population (2010)
  - Total: 1,969
  - Density: 34.76/sq mi (13.42/km^{2})
- FIPS code: 29-64010
- GNIS feature ID: 0766384

Saint Aubert Township is one of eighteen townships in Callaway County, Missouri, USA. As of the 2010 census, its population was 1,969.

St. Aubert is an old variant name of Mokane, Missouri.

== Geography ==
Saint Aubert Township covers an area of 57.36 square miles (148.6 km^{2}) and contains the incorporated settlement named Mokane, as well as the unincorporated settlement of Hams Prairie, plus other rural homes.

== History ==
The exact founding date of St Aubert Township is still to be determined by detailed local historical records, but it can be broadly estimated from historical publications. The township shows as extant on the 1876 official map of Callaway County, and its largest town (formerly called Smith's Landing, and now called Mokane) took on the name Saint Aubert around 1849, which may or may not be relevant to the formation of the township from what was the southern sector of Fulton Township (now East Fulton Township) immediately prior to its formation, and briefly part of Cote Sans Dessein Township during early 1821, near the time of Missouri statehood.
