= McCredie Township, Callaway County, Missouri =

Township in the American state of Missouri

McCredie Township
- Township
- Coordinates: 39°00′06″N 91°59′56″W
- Country: United States
- State: Missouri
- County: Callaway

Area
  - Total: 39.35 sq mi (101.91 km^{2})
  - Land: 39.13 sq mi (101.34 km^{2})
  - Water: 0.22 sq mi (0.58 km^{2}) 0.57%
- Elevation: 869 ft (265 m)

Population (2010)
  - Total: 760
  - Density: 19/sq mi (7.5/km^{2})
- FIPS code: 29-44876
- GNIS feature ID: 0766381

McCredie Township is one of eighteen townships in Callaway County, Missouri, USA. As of the 2010 census, its population was 760.

== History ==
McCredie Township was created sometime between 1883 and 1897 from what was before then, generally speaking, the southern sector of a much larger historic Liberty Township, with some alterations of adjacent township boundaries.

McCredie was the name of a prominent local family. The main town, long named McCredie, was fused into the incorporation of the village of Kingdom City in 1970.

== Geography ==
McCredie Township covers an area of 39.35 square miles (101.9 km^{2}) and contains one incorporated settlement, Kingdom City, plus rural homes.

The streams of Allen Branch, Leeper Branch, McKinney Creek, Rocky Branch and Sallees Branch run through this township.
