= Boydsville, Missouri =

Unincorporated community in Missouri, U.S.

Coordinates: 38°48′57″N 92°06′38″W

Boydsville is an unincorporated community in western Callaway County, in the U.S. state of Missouri. The community is in the Mark Twain National Forest 1.5 miles east of Cedar Creek and Fulton is approximately eight miles to the east-northeast.

== History ==
A post office called Boydsville was established in 1858, and remained in operation until 1906. John K. Boyd, an early postmaster, gave the community his name.
