= Shamrock Township, Callaway County, Missouri =

Township in the American state of Missouri

Shamrock Township
- Township
- Coordinates: 39°00′11″N 091°41′50″W
- Country: United States
- State: Missouri
- County: Callaway

Area
  - Total: 42.97 sq mi (111.29 km^{2})
  - Land: 42.90 sq mi (111.11 km^{2})
  - Water: 0.069 sq mi (0.18 km^{2}) 0.16%
- Elevation: 750 ft (230 m)

Population (2010)
  - Total: 413
  - Density: 9.63/sq mi (3.72/km^{2})
- FIPS code: 29-66962
- GNIS feature ID: 0766385

Shamrock Township is one of eighteen townships in Callaway County, Missouri, USA. As of the 2010 census, its population was 413.

== History ==
Shamrock Township was created between 1876 and 1897, per official county maps from these two years, from the northeast 1/4 (approximately) of what before then was a much larger Nine Mile Prairie Township. It's named for the shamrock, a national symbol of Ireland.

== Geography ==
Shamrock Township covers an area of 42.97 square miles (111.3 km^{2}) and contains no incorporated settlements, although the unincorporated village of Shamrock.

The streams of Appling Branch, Bachelor Creek, Brushy Branch, Harrison Creek, Heat String Creek and Morris Branch run through this township, which also contains three cemeteries named Augusta, Chatman, and Sawyers.

The township is bordered on the west by Jackson Township (Auxvasse), on the south by Nine Mile Prairie Township (Williamsburg), on the north by Audrain County, and on the east by Montgomery County.
