= Calwood, Missouri =

Unincorporated community in Missouri, U.S.

Coordinates: 38°55′13″N 91°51′10″W

Calwood is an unincorporated community in Callaway County, in the U.S. state of Missouri. The community lies at the intersection of Missouri Routes JJ and Z approximately one mile south of I-70. Fulton is about six miles to the southwest on Route Z. Auxvasse Creek flows past approximately one mile to the northeast.

== History ==
A post office called Calwood was established in 1874, and remained in operation until 1922. The community's name is an amalgamation of the names of Cal James and Edward Wood.
