= Whetstone Creek (Loutre River tributary) =

Stream in Montgomery and Callaway counties in Missouri, United States

Coordinates: 38°56′37″N 91°36′48″W

Whetstone Creek is a stream in Callaway and Montgomery counties in Missouri, United States, that is a tributary of the Loutre River.

== Description ==
Whetstone Creek was named for a nearby quarry from which settlers sourced whetstones.

== See also ==
- List of rivers of Missouri
