= Toledo, Callaway County, Missouri =

Unincorporated community in Missouri, U.S.

Coordinates: 38°50′26″N 91°49′06″W

Toledo is an unincorporated community in Callaway County, in the U.S. state of Missouri. The community is on routes JJ and UU, approximately six miles east of Fulton.

== History ==
A post office called Toledo was established in 1887, and remained in operation until 1905. The origin of the name Toledo is obscure.
