= Bourbon Township, Callaway County, Missouri =

Township in the American state of Missouri

Bourbon Township today
- Township
- Coordinates: 38°54′33″N 092°05′54″W
- Country: United States
- State: Missouri
- County: Callaway

Area
  - Total: 43.23 sq mi (111.97 km^{2})
  - Land: 42.74 sq mi (110.69 km^{2})
  - Water: 0.49 sq mi (1.27 km^{2}) 1.13%
- Elevation: 860 ft (262 m)

Population (2010)
  - Total: 2,059
  - Density: 48.18/sq mi (18.60/km^{2})
- FIPS code: 29-07516
- GNIS feature ID: 0766371

Bourbon Township is one of eighteen townships in Callaway County, Missouri, USA. As of the 2010 census, its population was 2,059.

== History ==
Bourbon Township was established Feb 21, 1825, and named after Bourbon County, Kentucky. The township was reduced in size by about one-third between 1883 and 1897 by the creation of Cleveland Township from what had up to that time been its northern sector. These changes are shown in historical maps listed in the bibliography of the article on Callaway County, Missouri, and are significant for historical and genealogical research.

== Geography ==
Bourbon Township today covers an area of 43.23 square miles (112.0 km^{2}) and while containing no incorporated settlements, it includes the unincorporated communities of Millersburg and historic Earl, plus rural homes. It contains two cemeteries: Mount Olivet and White Cloud, while Reeds Lake is within this township, and the stream of Owl Creek runs through this township.
