= Tebbetts, Missouri =

- Census-Designated Place
- Tebbetts, Missouri Bank, September 2026

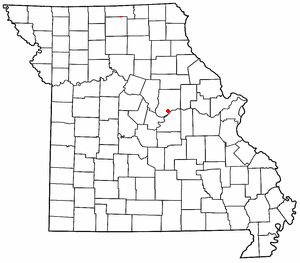
- Location of Tebbetts in Missouri
- Coordinates: 38°37′14″N 91°57′45″W
- Country: United States
- State: Missouri
- County: Callaway

Area
  - Total: 0.68 sq mi (1.75 km^{2})
  - Land: 0.65 sq mi (1.68 km^{2})
  - Water: 0.027 sq mi (0.07 km^{2})
- Elevation: 568 ft (173 m)

Population (2020)
  - Total: 64
  - Density: 98.4/sq mi (37.99/km^{2})
- ZIP code: 65080
- Area code: 573
- FIPS code: 29-70342
- GNIS feature ID: 727509

Tebbetts is an unincorporated community in southern Callaway County, Missouri, United States. It is part of the Jefferson City, Missouri Metropolitan Statistical Area. Tebbetts is located on Route 94, approximately 8 miles (13 km) east of Jefferson City, on the north edge of the Missouri River floodplain. As of the 2020 census, Tebbetts had a population of 64.

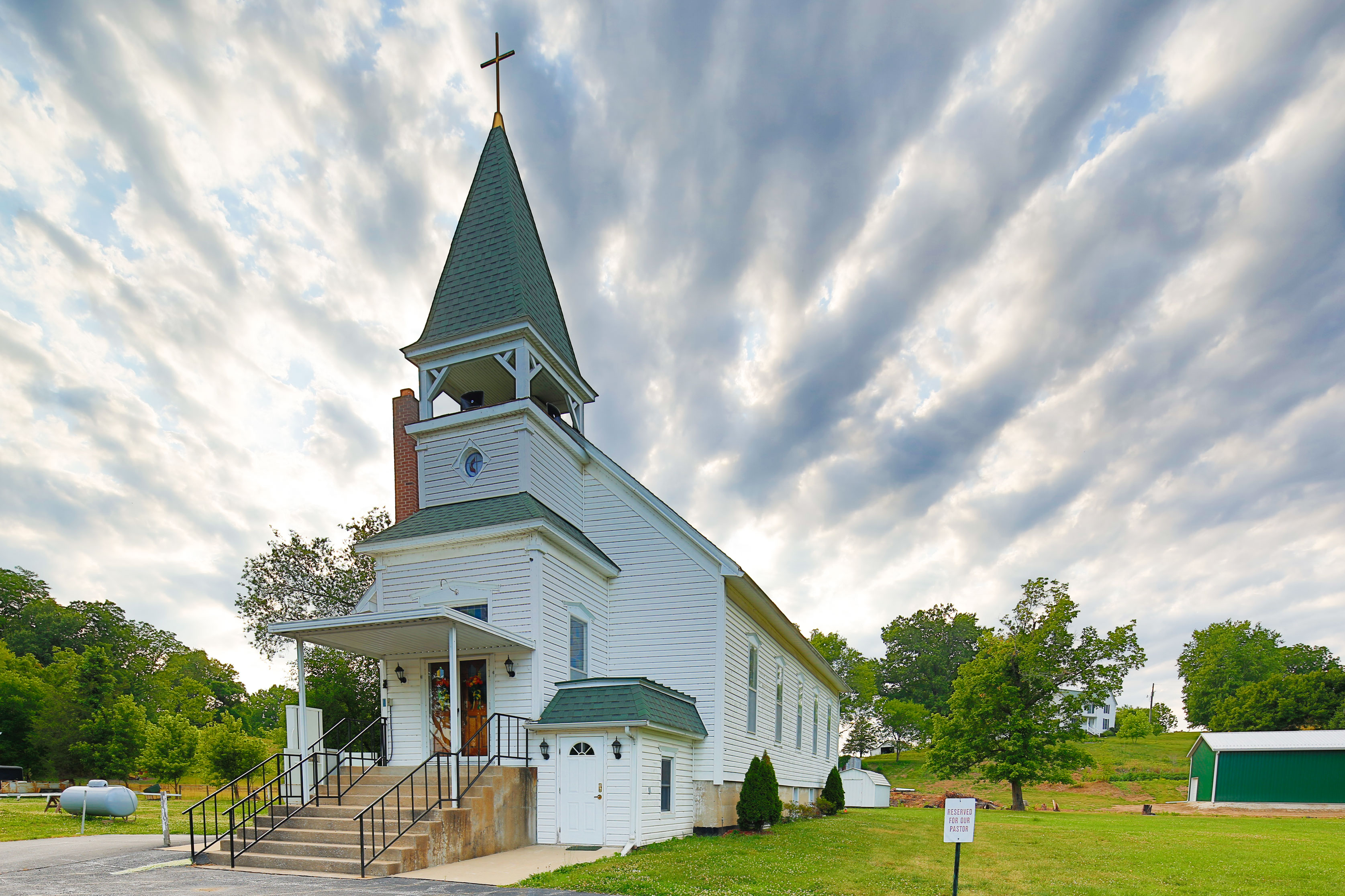
Tebbetts Missouri United Methodist Church, Spring 2012

A post office called Tebbetts has been in operation since 1895. The community was named after a railroad employee.

The Cote Sans Dessein Archeological Site and Oakley Chapel African Methodist Episcopal Church are listed on the National Register of Historic Places.

== Demographics ==
Historical population
Census	Pop.	Note	%±
2020	64		—
U.S. Decennial Census

Tebbets first appeared as a census designated place in the 2020 U.S. census.

== Education ==
It is in the Jefferson City Public Schools school district.
