= Hatton, Missouri =

Unincorporated community in Missouri

Coordinates: 39°01′27″N 92°01′35″W

Hatton is an unincorporated community in northwest Callaway County, in the U.S. state of Missouri. The community is on Missouri Route E 6.5 miles west of Auxvasse.

== History ==
A post office called Hatton was established in 1882, and remained in operation until 1953. Frank Hatton, an early postmaster, gave the community his last name.
