= Hams Prairie, Missouri =

Unincorporated community in Missouri, U.S.

Coordinates: 38°46′02″N 91°55′09″W

Hams Prairie (originally Ham's Prairie) is an unincorporated community in Callaway County, Missouri, United States. The town is located 5.5 miles south-southeast of Fulton on Missouri Route C. Mokane on the north edge of the Missouri River floodplain is six miles further south along Route C.

Hams Prairie is named for Rev. John Ham, a Methodist minister who arrived in Callaway County in 1815 and cut his name on a tree at the edge of the prairie one year later. A post office called Hams Prairie was established in 1865, and remained in operation until 1907.
