= Reform, Missouri =

Unincorporated community in Missouri, U.S.

Coordinates: 38°45′55″N 91°46′45″W

Reform is an unincorporated community in southeastern Callaway County, Missouri, United States. The community is located at the intersection of Routes CC and O approximately six miles north of Steedman and the Missouri River. The Reform Conservation Area lies just to the south. The Callaway Nuclear Generating Station is located at Reform.

== History ==
A post office called Reform was established in 1853, and remained in operation until 1907. The origin of the name Reform is obscure.
