= Yucatan, Missouri =

Unincorporated community in Missouri, U.S.

- Unincorporated community
- Location within Missouri
- Coordinates: 38°51′16″N 91°45′02″W
- Country: United States
- State: Missouri
- County: Callaway
- Elevation: 817 ft (249 m)
- Time zone: UTC-6 (Central (CST))
  - Summer (DST): UTC-5 (CDT)
- Area code: 573
- GNIS feature ID: 741377

Yucatan is an unincorporated community in eastern Callaway County, Missouri, United States. The community is on Missouri Route D about four miles south of I-70. Lake Lochaweeno is about two miles to the southwest.

A post office called Yucatan was established in 1892, and remained in operation until 1908. The community was named after the nearby Yucatan Baptist Church.
