= Concord, Callaway County, Missouri =

Unincorporated community in Missouri, U.S.

Coordinates: 39°01′59″N 91°58′04″W

Concord is an unincorporated community in northern Callaway County, in the U.S. state of Missouri. The community is located approximately four miles west-northwest of Auxvasse and about one-half mile north of Missouri Route E.

== History ==
Concord was platted in 1837, and named after the local Concord Presbyterian Church. A post office called Concord was established in 1838, and remained in operation until 1904.
