= Portland, Missouri =

Unincorporated community in Missouri, U.S.

Coordinates: 38°42′39″N 91°43′04″W

Portland, Missouri's trailhead on the Katy Trail

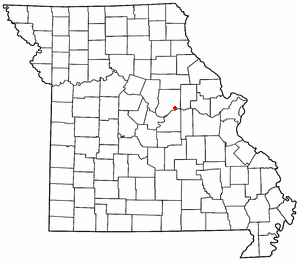

Portland is an unincorporated community in southeastern Callaway County, Missouri, United States. It is part of the Jefferson City, Missouri Metropolitan Statistical Area. Portland is located just north of the Missouri River on Route 94, about 24 miles east-northeast of Jefferson City.

== History ==
The village was laid out in 1831. Its location on the Missouri River made it a popular shipping point for the farms and plantations of Callaway County. The name Portland stems from that activity.
