= Caldwell Township, Callaway County, Missouri =

Township in the American state of Missouri

Caldwell Township
- Township
- Coordinates: 38°43′10″N 092°00′15″W
- Country: United States
- State: Missouri
- County: Callaway

Area
  - Total: 23.38 sq mi (60.56 km^{2})
  - Land: 23.34 sq mi (60.44 km^{2})
  - Water: 0.046 sq mi (0.12 km^{2}) 0.2%
- Elevation: 778 ft (237 m)

Population (2010)
  - Total: 438
  - Density: 18.8/sq mi (7.25/km^{2})
- FIPS code: 29-10414
- GNIS feature ID: 0766372

Caldwell Township is one of eighteen townships in Callaway County, Missouri, USA. As of the 2010 census, its population was 438.

== History ==
Caldwell Township was established on June 5, 1883, created from former portions of current adjacent townships (as of 2018), and named in honor of a local family. The township's boundaries changed between 1883 and 1897, per descriptions of boundaries in the 1884 Missouri State Library history of Callaway County and the subsequent official map of the county published in 1897.

== Geography ==
Caldwell Township covers an area of 23.38 square miles (60.6 km^{2}) and while containing no incorporated settlements, it has included the unincorporated community of "Dixie". It contains seven cemeteries: Bush, Caldwell, Cave, Foster, James, Knight and Mount Tabor; as well as the streams of Caldwell Branch, Prairie Fork and Prime Creek.
