= Earl, Missouri =

Unincorporated community in Missouri, U.S.

Coordinates: 38°55′52″N 92°03′41″W

Earl is an unincorporated community in Callaway County, in the U.S. state of Missouri.

== History ==
A post office called Earl was established in 1891, and remained in operation until 1907. The community was named after Earl Sexton, the son of a local merchant.
