= Holts Summit, Missouri =

- City
- City of Holts Summit
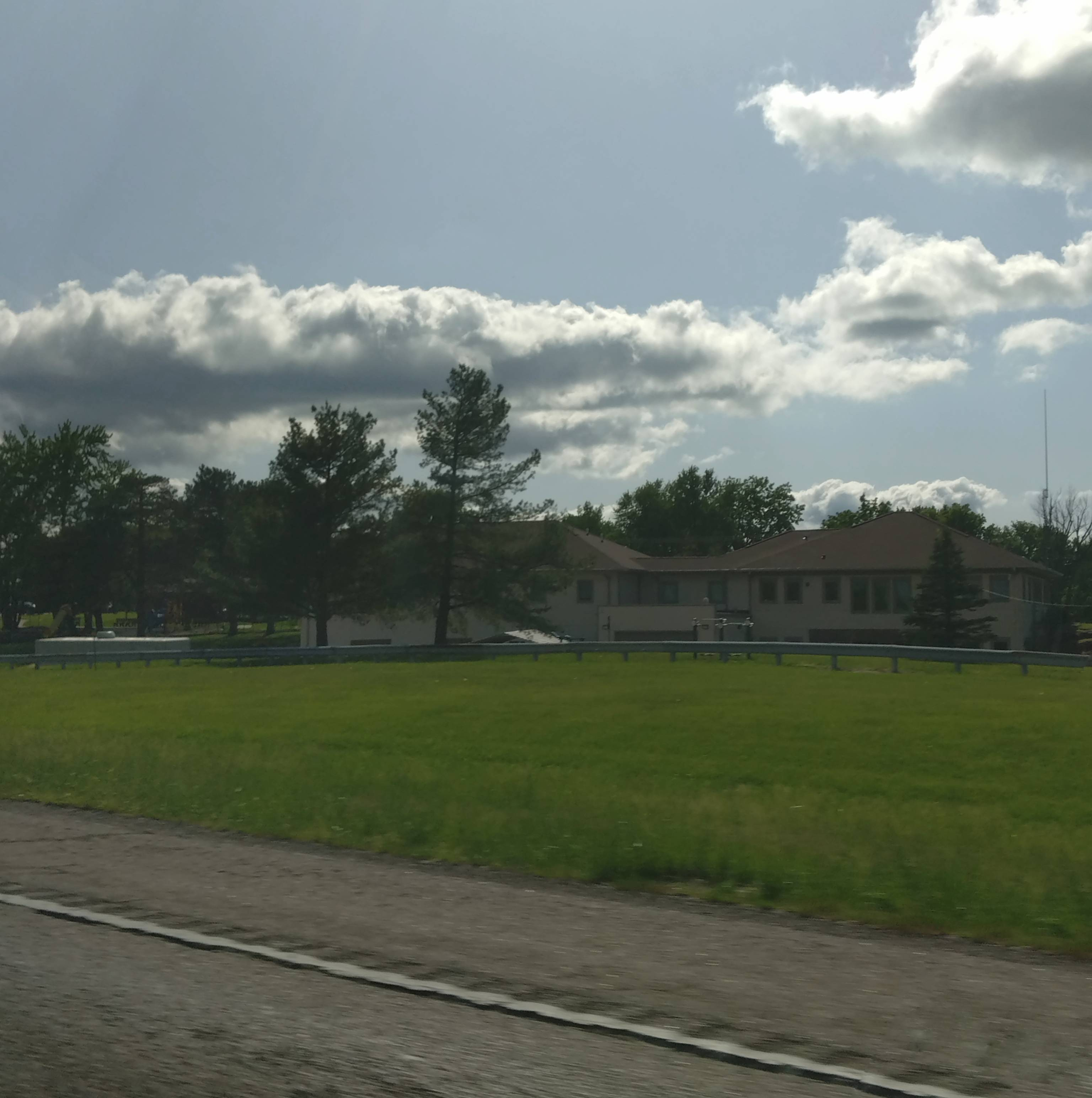
- Holts Summit in May 2024

- Location of Holts Summit, Missouri
- Coordinates: 38°38′50″N 92°06′51″W
- Country: United States
- State: Missouri
- County: Callaway
- Incorporated: 1973

Government
  - Mayor: Landon Oxley

Area
  - Total: 3.81 sq mi (9.86 km^{2})
  - Land: 3.71 sq mi (9.60 km^{2})
  - Water: 0.10 sq mi (0.26 km^{2})
- Elevation: 804 ft (245 m)

Population (2020)
  - Total: 4,458
  - Estimate (2023): 4,677
  - Density: 1,203.2/sq mi (464.55/km^{2})
- Time zone: UTC-6 (Central (CST))
  - Summer (DST): UTC-5 (CDT)
- ZIP code: 65043
- Area code: 573
- FIPS code: 29-32770
- GNIS feature ID: 2394409
- Website: www.holtssummit.gov

Holts Summit is a small city in Callaway County, Missouri. The population was 4,458 at the time of the 2020 census. Holts Summit is located 7 miles (11 km) northeast of Jefferson City, Missouri's state capital. It is part of the Jefferson City Metropolitan Area.

== History ==
Most of the pioneers in the early settlements were from the state of Virginia. One among them was Abner Holt who with his family traveled to Howard County, Missouri, in 1819. They settled there for the winter. The men built a house in Callaway County in the unnamed community now known as Holts Summit, and the family settled in during the spring.

In 1870, Holt's grandson, Timothy Holt, plotted Holts Summit around a general store built by his father James Holt. They named the village “Holts Summit” because it was the highest point from there to the Missouri River.

“Hibernia Station” was once located across from where North School is now located. The train carried travelers between Hibernia and Holts Summit. Because of declining traffic as cars became more popular, the train depot was torn down in 1934.

Holts Summit was incorporated in 1973.

In the 1960s and 1970s, winemakers began to rebuild the Missouri wine industry. Summit Lake Winery was founded in 2002 in Holts Summit, linking the town to what is called the Missouri Rhineland, the area defined by vineyards along the Missouri River from Callaway County to the western part of St. Charles County.

== Geography ==
Holts Summit is located at 38°38′55″N 92°7′1″W (38.648569, -92.116831).

According to the United States Census Bureau, the city has a total area of 3.49 square miles (9.04 km^{2}), of which 3.44 square miles (8.91 km^{2}) is land and 0.05 square miles (0.13 km^{2}) is water.

== Demographics ==
Historical population
Census	Pop.	Note	%±
1880	23		—
1980	2,540		—
1990	2,292		−9.8%
2000	2,935		28.1%
2010	3,247		10.6%
2020	4,458		37.3%
U.S. Decennial Census

=== 2020 census ===
As of the 2020 census, Holts Summit had a population of 4,458. The median age was 38.2 years. 24.2% of residents were under the age of 18 and 17.6% of residents were 65 years of age or older. For every 100 females there were 93.6 males, and for every 100 females age 18 and over there were 88.9 males age 18 and over.

95.9% of residents lived in urban areas, while 4.1% lived in rural areas.

There were 1,803 households in Holts Summit, of which 31.3% had children under the age of 18 living in them. Of all households, 48.5% were married-couple households, 16.5% were households with a male householder and no spouse or partner present, and 26.2% were households with a female householder and no spouse or partner present. About 26.8% of all households were made up of individuals and 11.5% had someone living alone who was 65 years of age or older.

There were 1,936 housing units, of which 6.9% were vacant. The homeowner vacancy rate was 2.2% and the rental vacancy rate was 9.3%.

Racial composition as of the 2020 census
Race	Number	Percent
White	3,816	85.6%
Black or African American	214	4.8%
American Indian and Alaska Native	12	0.3%
Asian	25	0.6%
Native Hawaiian and Other Pacific Islander	10	0.2%
Some other race	63	1.4%
Two or more races	318	7.1%
Hispanic or Latino (of any race)	162	3.6%

=== 2010 census ===
As of the census of 2010, there were 3,247 people, 1,377 households, and 896 families residing in the city. The population density was 943.9 inhabitants per square mile (364.4/km^{2}). There were 1,572 housing units at an average density of 457.0 units per square mile (176.4 units/km^{2}). The racial makeup of the city was 92.1% White, 3.9% African American, 0.3% Native American, 0.5% Asian, 0.1% Pacific Islander, 1.0% from other races, and 2.1% from two or more races. Hispanic or Latino of any race were 2.2% of the population.

There were 1,377 households, of which 30.8% had children under the age of 18 living with them, 46.1% were married couples living together, 13.9% had a female householder with no husband present, 5.1% had a male householder with no wife present, and 34.9% were non-families. 28.0% of all households were made up of individuals, and 10.4% had someone living alone who was 65 years of age or older. The average household size was 2.35 and the average family size was 2.83.

The median age in the city was 37.7 years. 22.7% of residents were under the age of 18; 8.5% were between the ages of 18 and 24; 27.5% were from 25 to 44; 28.4% were from 45 to 64; and 12.8% were 65 years of age or older. The gender makeup of the city was 48.0% male and 52.0% female.

=== 2000 census ===
As of the census of 2000, there were 2,935 people, 1,124 households, and 794 families residing in the city. The population density was 886.3 inhabitants per square mile (342.2/km^{2}). There were 1,227 housing units at an average density of 370.5 units per square mile (143.1 units/km^{2}). The racial makeup of the city was 94.51% White, 2.96% African American, 0.85% Native American, 0.07% Asian, 0.27% from other races, and 1.33% from two or more races. Hispanic or Latino of any race were 1.26% of the population.

There were 1,124 households, out of which 39.1% had children under the age of 18 living with them, 50.6% were married couples living together, 14.2% had a female householder with no husband present, and 29.3% were non-families. 24.3% of all households were made up of individuals, and 7.2% had someone living alone who was 65 years of age or older. The average household size was 2.58 and the average family size was 3.04.

In the city, the population was spread out, with 30.3% under the age of 18, 9.2% from 18 to 24, 31.4% from 25 to 44, 20.0% from 45 to 64, and 9.1% who were 65 years of age or older. The median age was 32 years. For every 100 females, there were 94.8 males. For every 100 females age 18 and over, there were 90.2 males.

The median income for a household in the city was $35,313, and the median income for a family was $40,701. Males had a median income of $29,622 versus $23,576 for females. The per capita income for the city was $16,633. About 7.6% of families and 11.2% of the population were below the poverty line, including 13.3% of those under age 18 and 14.4% of those age 65 or over.

== Education ==
The majority of the territory is in the Jefferson City Public Schools school district. A portion of the city limits to the north is in the New Bloomfield R-III School District.
