= Williamsburg, Missouri =

Unincorporated community in Missouri, U.S.

Coordinates: 38°55′13″N 91°42′06″W

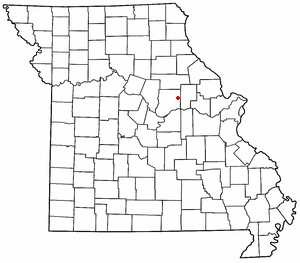

Williamsburg is an unincorporated community in eastern Callaway County, Missouri, United States. It is located on Missouri Supplemental Route D just north of Interstate 70, approximately thirteen miles northeast of Fulton. The Whetstone Creek Conservation Area along Whetstone Creek lies about one mile to the north. The ZIP Code for Williamsburg is 63388.

== History ==
An old variant name was Fruits. A post office called Fruits was established in 1824, and the name was changed to Williamsburg in 1835. The present name is after Harvey Williams, in whose house the post office once was located.
