= Round Prairie Township, Callaway County, Missouri =

Township in the American state of Missouri

Round Prairie Township today
- Township
- Coordinates: 38°49′19″N 092°04′46″W
- Country: United States
- State: Missouri
- County: Callaway

Area
  - Total: 34.48 sq mi (89.31 km^{2})
  - Land: 34 sq mi (89 km^{2})
  - Water: 0.12 sq mi (0.3 km^{2}) 0.34%
- Elevation: 860 ft (262 m)

Population (2010)
  - Total: 1,038
  - Density: 30/sq mi (12/km^{2})
- FIPS code: 29-63362
- GNIS feature ID: 0766383

Round Prairie Township is one of eighteen townships in Callaway County, Missouri, USA. As of the 2010 census, its population was 1038.

== Geography ==
Round Prairie Township covers an area of 34.48 square miles (89.3 km^{2}) and contains the unincorporated settlements of Carrington, near the headwaters of the Missouri River tributary Middle River, and Boydsville, near another Missouri River tributary (Cedar Creek) bordering Boone County, although no incorporated settlements. It contains four cemeteries: Boydsville, Hundley, Millers Creek, and Paris Fork, as well as the streams Davis Creek, Millers Creek, and Smith Creek.

== History ==
Created on May 14, 1821, the township initially covered at least the northern 2/3 of the western border areas of Callaway County, from "the township line (boundary?) of 45 and 46 northward to the Audrain County line and eastward to a line along what is now the western boundary of West Fulton Township".

In 1824, Round Prairie Township was reduced in size by the creation of Cedar Township to its south from what was the remainder of the western sector of Cote Sans Dessein Township, and within a year, in 1825, Round Prairie Township was further reduced substantially in size with the creation of a larger-than-today Bourbon township from its northern sector. This continued for about 60 years.

A Round Prairie Post Office, from May 30, 1827 to June 16, 1841, 'about one-half mile north of New Bloomfield' was clearly inside previous Round Prairie Township boundaries, but near the boundary with the new Cedar Township created from its southern portion in 1824 (and 50 years prior to the creation of Guthrie Township).(See Missouri State Historical Society on Callaway place name changes.)

Between 1883 and 1897, Round Prairie Township was again reduced in size by the creation of Guthrie Township from its southernmost area. These changes are significant for research on historical events and genealogy. A detailed historic map of Round Prairie township in 1930, with about the same boundaries as exist today, can be found on the last page of the atlas posted at:

- http://cdm16795.contentdm.oclc.org/cdm/ref/collection/moplatbooks/id/656

Further historical maps and texts describing historic township boundaries are posted in the bibliography of the article on Callaway County, Missouri.
