= Mokane, Missouri =

- City
- Downtown Mokane in September 2026

- Location of Mokane, Missouri
- Coordinates: 38°40′29″N 91°52′35″W
- Country: United States
- State: Missouri
- County: Callaway

Area
  - Total: 0.29 sq mi (0.76 km^{2})
  - Land: 0.29 sq mi (0.76 km^{2})
  - Water: 0 sq mi (0.00 km^{2})
- Elevation: 532 ft (162 m)

Population (2020)
  - Total: 188
  - Density: 641.4/sq mi (247.66/km^{2})
- Time zone: UTC-6 (Central (CST))
  - Summer (DST): UTC-5 (CDT)
- ZIP code: 65059
- Area code: 573
- FIPS code: 29-49070
- GNIS feature ID: 2395364
- Website: mokanemo.gov

Mokane (/moʊˈkeɪn/ moh-KAYN), founded as Smith's Landing and later known as Saint Aubert, is a city in southern Callaway County, Missouri, United States. As of the 2020 census, Mokane had a population of 188. It is part of the Jefferson City Metropolitan Statistical Area.

== History ==
The settlement was first named Smith's Landing, after Thomas Smith, who settled there around 1818, and is said to be the second- or third-oldest town in Callaway County.

The settlement took on the name Saint Aubert around the time a post office was built there in 1849. Official Callaway County maps of 1876 show St. Aubert, which was also the name of its township area. The town was still referred to as Saint Aubert when Livingston's History of Northeast Missouri went to press in 1883 or 1884.

On July 1, 1893, the Missouri, Kansas and Eastern Railway, a subsidiary of the MKT Missouri-Kansas-Texas Railroad, took possession of the rail line that passed through the town to Saint Louis. The line included a station stop. Within a few years, the town received a new name based on the name of the railroad: Mo., Kan. & E. In 1897, Callaway County's official map shows the town named "Mokane". Compared to the 1876 map, it also moves the town one land section northward, due to the inundation of old Saint Aubert.

== Geography ==
Mokane is located on the north side of the Missouri River valley along Missouri Route 94 between Tebbetts to the southwest and Steedman to the northeast. Fulton lies about twelve miles to the north along Missouri Route C. The Katy Trail, a rails-to-trails hiking/biking path, runs through the town, which stands at mile 125.

According to the United States Census Bureau, the city has a total area of 0.29 square miles (0.75 km^{2}), all land.

== Demographics ==
Historical population
Census	Pop.	Note	%±
1900	331		—
1910	646		95.2%
1920	726		12.4%
1930	575		−20.8%
1940	544		−5.4%
1950	477		−12.3%
1960	419		−12.2%
1970	398		−5.0%
1980	293		−26.4%
1990	186		−36.5%
2000	188		1.1%
2010	185		−1.6%
2020	188		1.6%
U.S. Decennial Census

=== 2010 census ===
As of the census of 2010, there were 185 people, 73 households, and 48 families residing in the city. The population density was 637.9 inhabitants per square mile (246.3/km^{2}). There were 87 housing units at an average density of 300.0 per square mile (115.8/km^{2}). The racial makeup of the city was 97.8% White, 0.5% Native American, and 1.6% from two or more races. Hispanic or Latino of any race were 1.6% of the population.

There were 73 households, of which 46.6% had children under the age of 18 living with them, 31.5% were married couples living together, 23.3% had a female householder with no husband present, 11.0% had a male householder with no wife present, and 34.2% were non-families. 27.4% of all households were made up of individuals, and 9.6% had someone living alone who was 65 years of age or older. The average household size was 2.53 and the average family size was 2.96.

The median age in the city was 26.8 years. 31.4% of residents were under the age of 18; 14% were between the ages of 18 and 24; 29.3% were from 25 to 44; 18.3% were from 45 to 64; and 7% were 65 years of age or older. The gender makeup of the city was 44.9% male and 55.1% female.

=== 2000 census ===
As of the census of 2000, there were 188 people, 77 households, and 48 families residing in the city, including the Weber household. The population density was 628.6 inhabitants per square mile (242.7/km^{2}). There were 91 housing units at an average density of 304.3 per square mile (117.5/km^{2}). The racial makeup of the city was 98.94% White, 0.53% Native American and 0.53% Asian. Hispanic or Latino of any race were 0.53% of the population.

There were 77 households, of which 39.0% had children under the age of 18 living with them, 49.4% were married couples living together, 14.3% had a female householder with no husband present, and 36.4% were non-families. 29.9% of all households were made up of individuals, and 13.0% had someone living alone who was 65 years of age or older. The average household size was 2.44 and the average family size was 3.00.

Mokane's population was spread out, with 28.7% under the age of 18, 8.0% from 18 to 24, 31.4% from 25 to 44, 18.6% from 45 to 64, and 13.3% who were 65 years of age or older. The median age was 32 years. For every 100 females, there were 77.4 males. For every 100 females age 18 and over, there were 86.1 males.

The median income for a household in the city was $55,625, and the median income for a family was $73,750. Males had a median income of $44,250 versus $20,750 for females. The per capita income for the city was $20,175. About 6.5% of families and 14.1% of the population were below the poverty line, including 14.0% of those under the age of eighteen and none of those 65 or over.

== Government ==
As of April 2022, the mayor is Chad Booher. The city office was moved after the Mississippi River floods of 2019.
