= Kingdom City, Missouri =

Village in Missouri, US

- Village
- Village of Kingdom City
- Kingdom City Post Office

- Location of Kingdom City, Missouri
- Coordinates: 38°56′50″N 91°56′19″W
- Country: United States
- State: Missouri
- County: Callaway
- Incorporated: 1973

Area
  - Total: 1.87 sq mi (4.85 km^{2})
  - Land: 1.85 sq mi (4.80 km^{2})
  - Water: 0.019 sq mi (0.05 km^{2})
- Elevation: 801 ft (244 m)

Population (2020)
  - Total: 134
  - Density: 72.3/sq mi (27.91/km^{2})
- Time zone: UTC-6 (Central (CST))
  - Summer (DST): UTC-5 (CDT)
- ZIP code: 65262
- Area code: 573
- FIPS code: 29-38792
- GNIS feature ID: 2398350
- Website: www.kingdomcitymo.gov

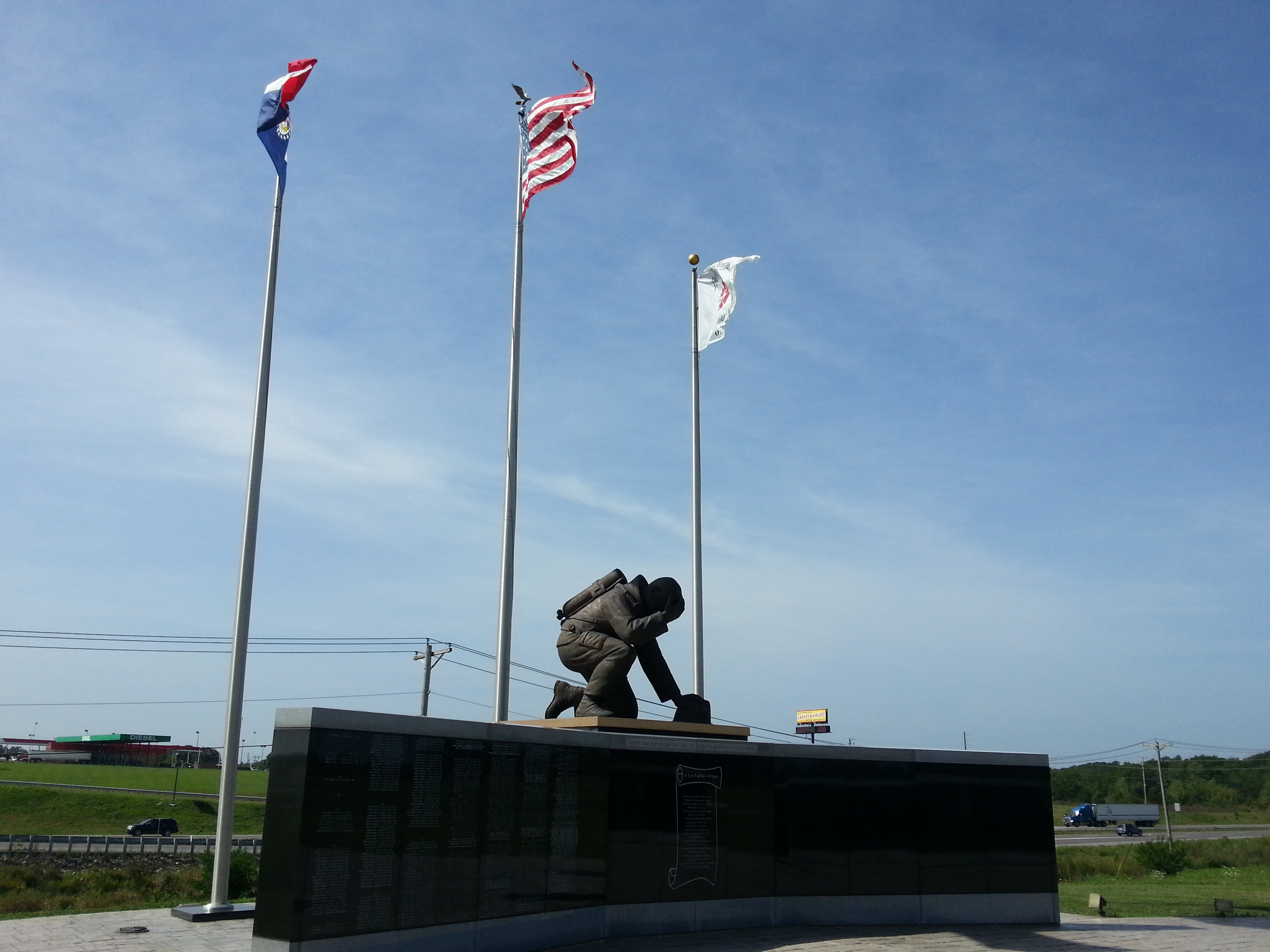
"Fire Fighter in Prayer" statue atop memorial wall, Fire Fighters Memorial of Missouri

Kingdom City is a village in Callaway County, Missouri, United States. It is part of the Jefferson City Metropolitan Statistical Area. As of the 2020 census, Kingdom City had a population of 134. The village lies north of the intersection of Interstate 70 and U.S. Route 54.

== History ==
The intersection that would give rise to Kingdom City was built in the late 1920s. The city of Fulton hoped that the planned US Route 40 would run from Columbia to their city, where it would intersect with the planned US Route 54. But residents of McCredie to the north fought for a route closer to their town, including staging a parade through the heart of Fulton with banners that read "54-40 or Fight". On December 30, 1925, the Supreme Court backed the Highway Commission's chosen route through a rural farm and forested area south of McCredie.

When the road was being built and huge numbers of workers were brought in to do the work, McCredie became a boom town. The future Kingdom City received its first gas station and a two-story hotel, which burned down in 1930.

At the time, the intersection was referred to only as the "Y". People in Fulton wanted to name it "North Fulton"; people in McCredie called it "South McCredie". The Kingdom Oil Company, owned by B.P. (Bernard Parker) Beamer, suggested Kingdom City after the nickname for Callaway County.

Through the 1920s and 30s, numerous dance halls, restaurants, cafés, and hotels came and went in Kingdom City. Gasper's opened for business in 1965, and presently became a local landmark. In 1970, the McCredie Post Office moved to Kingdom City and took the community's name. This was the same year Kingdom City incorporated as a village and included the former unincorporated community of McCredie.

The Richland Christian Church was listed on the National Register of Historic Places in 2001.

== Geography ==
Kingdom City is located along U.S. Route 54 about a half-mile north of I-70. McKinney Creek flows past the south edge of the community and Auxvasse Creek passes two miles to the north. The town of Auxvasse lies about five miles north along Route 54. As of May 2024, the Route 54/I-70 intersection was to be upgraded, with roundabouts and a flyover, part of a larger project to expand I-70 in Missouri.

According to the United States Census Bureau, the village has a total area of 1.82 square miles (4.71 km^{2}), of which 1.80 square miles (4.66 km^{2}) of it is land and 0.02 square miles (0.05 km^{2}) is water.

== Demographics ==
Historical population
| Census | Pop. | Note | %± |
|---|---|---|---|
| 1970 | 53 | | — |
| 1980 | 146 | | 175.5% |
| 1990 | 112 | | −23.3% |
| 2000 | 121 | | 8.0% |
| 2010 | 128 | | 5.8% |
| 2020 | 134 | | 4.7% |
U.S. Decennial Census

=== 2010 census ===
As of the census of 2010, there were 128 people, 49 households, and 34 families living in the village. The population density was 71.1 inhabitants per square mile (27.5/km^{2}). There were 55 housing units at an average density of 30.6 per square mile (11.8/km^{2}). The racial makeup of the village was 93.0% White, 6.3% African American, and 0.8% from two or more races. Hispanic or Latino of any race were 0.8% of the population.

There were 49 households, of which 24.5% had children under the age of 18 living with them, 53.1% were married couples living together, 8.2% had a female householder with no husband present, 8.2% had a male householder with no wife present, and 30.6% were non-families. 24.5% of all households were made up of individuals, and 10.2% had someone living alone who was 65 years of age or older. The average household size was 2.61 and the average family size was 3.09.

The median age in the village was 40 years. 22.7% of residents were under the age of 18; 8.6% were between the ages of 18 and 24; 23.4% were from 25 to 44; 25.8% were from 45 to 64; and 19.5% were 65 years of age or older. The gender makeup of the village was 50.8% male and 49.2% female.

=== 2000 census ===
As of the census of 2000, there were 121 people, 51 households, and 36 families living in the village. The population density was 89.3 inhabitants per square mile (34.5/km^{2}). There were 54 housing units at an average density of 39.9 per square mile (15.4/km^{2}). The racial makeup of the village was 90.91% White, 6.61% African American, 0.83% Native American, and 1.65% from two or more races.

There were 51 households, out of which 29.4% had children under the age of 18 living with them, 54.9% were married couples living together, 11.8% had a female householder with no husband present, and 29.4% were non-families. 21.6% of all households were made up of individuals, and 13.7% had someone living alone who was 65 years of age or older. The average household size was 2.37 and the average family size was 2.69.

In the village, the population was spread out, with 21.5% under the age of 18, 5.0% from 18 to 24, 23.1% from 25 to 44, 32.2% from 45 to 64, and 18.2% who were 65 years of age or older. The median age was 45 years. For every 100 females, there were 108.6 males. For every 100 females age 18 and over, there were 90.0 males.

The median income for a household in the village was $35,417, and the median income for a family was $34,583. Males had a median income of $28,125 versus $17,750 for females. The per capita income for the village was $16,978. None of the population and none of the families were below the poverty line.

== Education ==
It is in the North Callaway County R-I School District.

== Sources ==
- William S. Bryan and Robert Rose, A History of the Pioneer Families of Missouri, with numerous sketches, anecdotes, adventures, etc., relating to Early Days in Missouri, St. Louis, Missouri: Bryan, Brand & Co., 1876
