= Cedar City, Missouri =

Community in Callaway County, Missouri, US

Coordinates: 38°35′50″N 92°10′47″W

Cedar City is a former incorporated city in southern Callaway County, Missouri, United States. It is located on the Missouri River floodplain across the river channel from Jefferson City and is near the interchange of U.S. Routes 54 and 63. It is part of the Jefferson City, Missouri Metropolitan Statistical Area.

Cedar City was platted in 1866 and is named after the eastern redcedar tree. David Kenney, owner of the Cedar City Land Company petitioned to have the community incorporated in 1870. It existed as a city until 1989, when the city merged into Jefferson City. The population of the city before the merger was reported as 427 in the 1980 Decennial Census. Flooding of the Missouri River in 1993 inundated the entire community and virtually all the homeowners were bought out by the Federal Emergency Management Administration (FEMA). Most of the area of the former city now consists of parks and businesses. A post office called Cedar City has been in operation since 1870.
