= Cedar Creek (Missouri River tributary) =

Stream in the U.S. state of Missouri

Cedar Creek is a stream in Boone and Callaway counties of the U.S. state of Missouri. It is a tributary of the Missouri River. The headwaters of Cedar Creek are in the northeast of Boone County about five miles east of Hallsville and one mile west of the Audrain-Boone county line. The stream flows south and about five miles south of its headwaters becoming the boundary between Boone and Callaway counties. The stream crosses under Interstate 70 about eight miles east of Columbia and enters the Mark Twain National Forest. The stream flows south to southwest through the national forest and upon leaving the forest turns to the east and ceases to be the county line. The stream flows east for about one mile then turns south and flows under U. S. Route 63 and into the Missouri River four miles northwest of Cedar City and across the river from Jefferson City. The Katy Trail crosses Cedar Creek just north of its confluence with the Missouri.

he stream source is at 39°06′26″N 92°08′01″W and the confluence is at 38°38′24″N 92°12′37″W.

Cedar Creek was named for the cedar timber along its course.

== See also ==
- List of rivers of Missouri
