= Missouri Route 94 =

State highway in Missouri, U.S.

Route 94
- MO 94 highlighted in red

Route information
- Maintained by MoDOT
- Length: 136.297 mi (219.349 km)
- Existed: 1922–present

Major junctions
- West end: US 54 / US 63 in Jefferson City
- Route 19 in McKittrick; Route 47 in Marthasville; I-64 / US 40 in Weldon Spring; Route 364 in St. Peters; I-70 in St. Charles; Route 370 in St. Charles
- East end: US 67 in West Alton

Location
- Country: United States
- State: Missouri
- Counties: Callaway; Montgomery; Warren; St. Charles

Highway system
- Missouri State Highway System; Interstate; US; State; Supplemental
← Route 92	→ Route 95

Route 94 serves eastern and central Missouri. The entire route closely parallels the Missouri River. The eastern terminus is at U.S. Route 67 in West Alton; its western terminus is at the intersection of U.S. Route 54 and U.S. Route 63 in Jefferson City.

Route 94 was one of the original 1922 highways, but its western terminus was in St. Charles at Route 2 (now U.S. Route 40) and Route 9 (now U.S. Route 61). US 40/61 are now part of Interstate 64, an important freeway in the area.

This highway joins with Route 364 for a short distance in St. Charles County. In addition, Route 94 joins with Route 47 for a short distance in Warren County. Route 94 makes up one side of the Golden Triangle in St. Charles County. In 2006 the north part of 94 towards West Alton was under heavy re-construction to widen both lanes to make it safer for traffic.

== Major intersections ==
All exits are unnumbered.

County	Location	mi	km	Exit	Destinations	Notes
Callaway	Jefferson City	0.000– 0.481	0.000– 0.774		US 63 south / US 54 – Columbia, Fulton, Jefferson City	Roadway continues from the west as US 63
Montgomery	Hermann	44.454	71.542		Route 19 to I-70 – Hermann, New Florence	
Warren	Marthasville	70.782	113.913		Route 47 north – Warrenton	Western end of MO 47 concurrency
Warren		74.612	120.076		Route 47 south – Washington	Eastern end of MO 47 concurrency. Access to Mercy Hospital.
St. Charles	Weldon Spring	99.270	159.760		I-64 / US 40 / US 61 (Avenue of the Saints) – St. Louis, Wentzville	Exit 9 on Interstate 64
St. Charles	St. Peters	103.054	165.849		Route 364 west / Mid Rivers Mall Drive, Pitman Hill Road	No direct access to westbound Route 364; western end of Route 364 concurrency; exit 8 on Route 364
St. Charles	St. Peters	103.895	167.203	9A	Kisker Road, Central School Road, Harvestowne Industrial Drive	
St. Charles	St. Peters	105.441	169.691	10	Jungermann Road	Eastbound exit and westbound entrance
St. Charles	St. Peters	105.845– 107.510	170.341– 173.021	11	Woodstone Drive, Harvester Road, Jungs Station Road, Heritage Crossing	
St. Charles	St. Charles	107.536	173.062	13	Route 364 east – St. Louis	East end of MO 364 concurrency; no exit number westbound; east end of expressway
St. Charles	St. Charles	110.353	177.596		Veterans Memorial Parkway	Interchange
St. Charles	St. Charles	110.424	177.710		I-70	Exit 228 on Interstate 70
St. Charles	St. Charles	110.502	177.836		Boone's Lick Road	Interchange
St. Charles	St. Charles	113.991	183.451		Route 370	Exit 7 on MO 370
St. Charles	West Alton	136.297	219.349		US 67	
1.000 mi = 1.609 km; 1.000 km = 0.621 mi: Concurrency terminus; Incomplete access

== See also ==
- List of state highways in Missouri
