= Auxvasse, Missouri =

- City
- City of Auxvasse
- Auxvasse in September 2026

- Location of Auxvasse, Missouri
- Coordinates: 39°01′03″N 91°53′45″W
- Country: United States
- State: Missouri
- County: Callaway
- Founded: 1873 (as Clinton City)
- Incorporated: 1874
- Named for: The Auxvasse Creek

Area
  - Total: 0.76 sq mi (1.96 km^{2})
  - Land: 0.76 sq mi (1.96 km^{2})
  - Water: 0 sq mi (0.00 km^{2})
- Elevation: 866 ft (264 m)

Population (2020)
  - Total: 1,001
  - Density: 1,325.8/sq mi (511.89/km^{2})
- Time zone: UTC-6 (Central (CST))
  - Summer (DST): UTC-5 (CDT)
- ZIP code: 65231
- Area code: 573
- FIPS code: 29-02638
- GNIS feature ID: 2394038
- Website: www.auxvassemo.com

Auxvasse (/əˈvɔːz/ ə-VAWZ or /oʊˈvɔːz/ oh-VAWZ) is a city in northern Callaway County, Missouri, United States. It is part of the Jefferson City, Missouri Metropolitan Statistical Area. As of the 2020 census, Auxvasse had a population of 1,001.

== History ==
Auxvasse was originally called Clinton City, and under the latter name was platted in 1873 named after the nearby Auxvasse Creek. A post office called Auxvasse has been in operation since 1874. Auxvasse has been claimed by at least 3 Callaway County townships since they were first delineated in 1821, when Auxvasse was located at the far northeast corner of the original boundaries of the then far-larger Cote Sans Dessein township for a period of only a few months. New townships (Fulton, Round Prairie, Nine Mile Prairie) were formed 1821–1838 in northern Callaway County, and a study of historical references should clarify which township Auxvasse was claimed by during that period. In February 1838, the newly formed Liberty Township included Auxvasse as a key town in its eastern sector for nearly 40 years; but when the newer Jackson Township was created in December 1875, Auxvasse was included instead in its western half, where it remains to this day as its largest population center.

Auxvasse Post Office

== Geography ==
Auxvasse is located in the northern part of the county on US Route 54 between Mexico to the north and Kingdom City to the south.

According to the United States Census Bureau, the city has a total area of 0.76 square miles (1.97 km^{2}), all land.

== Demographics ==
Historical population
Census	Pop.	Note	%±
1890	348		—
1900	337		−3.2%
1910	411		22.0%
1920	484		17.8%
1930	438		−9.5%
1940	490		11.9%
1950	507		3.5%
1960	534		5.3%
1970	808		51.3%
1980	858		6.2%
1990	821		−4.3%
2000	901		9.7%
2010	983		9.1%
2020	1,001		1.8%
U.S. Decennial Census

=== 2010 census ===
As of the census of 2010, there were 983 people, 405 households, and 261 families living in the city. The population density was 1,293.4 inhabitants per square mile (499.4/km^{2}). There were 472 housing units at an average density of 621.1 per square mile (239.8/km^{2}). The racial makeup of the city was 94.1% White, 3.2% African American, 1.3% Native American, 0.5% Asian, 0.3% from other races, and 0.6% from two or more races. Hispanic or Latino of any race were 1.1% of the population.

There were 405 households, of which 37.5% had children under the age of 18 living with them, 45.9% were married couples living together, 12.6% had a female householder with no husband present, 5.9% had a male householder with no wife present, and 35.6% were non-families. 29.9% of all households were made up of individuals, and 12.6% had someone living alone who was 65 years of age or older. The average household size was 2.43 and the average family size was 3.03.

The median age in the city was 36.5 years. 28.4% of residents were under the age of 18; 8.7% were between the ages of 18 and 24; 24.9% were from 25 to 44; 24.8% were from 45 to 64; and 13.2% were 65 years of age or older. The gender makeup of the city was 47.4% male and 52.6% female.

=== 2000 census ===
As of the census of 2000, there were 901 people, 381 households, and 240 families living in the city. The population density was 1,356.6 inhabitants per square mile (523.8/km^{2}). There were 400 housing units at an average density of 602.3 per square mile (232.5/km^{2}). The racial makeup of the city was 95.01% White, 3.22% African American, 0.44% Native American, 0.11% Asian, 0.11% from other races, and 1.11% from two or more races. Hispanic or Latino of any race were 0.44% of the population.

There were 381 households, out of which 31.8% had children under the age of 18 living with them, 48.0% were married couples living together, 11.3% had a female householder with no husband present, and 37.0% were non-families. 31.2% of all households were made up of individuals, and 18.4% had someone living alone who was 65 years of age or older. The average household size was 2.34 and the average family size was 2.91.

In the city, the population was spread out, with 26.4% under the age of 18, 7.1% from 18 to 24, 29.4% from 25 to 44, 20.0% from 45 to 64, and 17.1% who were 65 years of age or older. The median age was 37 years. For every 100 females, there were 88.1 males. For every 100 females age 18 and over, there were 85.2 males.

The median income for a household in the city was $33,875, and the median income for a family was $42,700. Males had a median income of $28,214 versus $21,250 for females. The per capita income for the city was $15,785. About 6.7% of families and 11.4% of the population were below the poverty line, including 9.6% of those under age 18 and 18.1% of those age 65 or over.

== Education ==
It is in the North Callaway County R-I School District.
