= Callaway County, Missouri =

County in Missouri, United States

- County
- Callaway County Courthouse in Fulton

- Location within the U.S. state of Missouri
- Coordinates: 38°50′N 91°55′W
- Country: United States
- State: Missouri
- Founded: November 25, 1820
- Named for: James Callaway
- Seat: Fulton
- Largest city: Fulton

Area
  - Total: 847 sq mi (2,190 km^{2})
  - Land: 835 sq mi (2,160 km^{2})
  - Water: 13 sq mi (34 km^{2}) 1.5%

Population (2020)
  - Total: 44,283
  - Estimate (2025): 45,765 ▲
  - Density: 53.0/sq mi (20.5/km^{2})
- Time zone: UTC−6 (Central)
  - Summer (DST): UTC−5 (CDT)
- Congressional district: 3rd
- Website: callawaycounty.org

Callaway County is a county located in the U.S. state of Missouri. As of the 2020 United States census, the county's population was 44,283. Its county seat is Fulton. With a border formed by the Missouri River, the county was organized November 25, 1820, and named for Captain James Callaway, grandson of Daniel Boone. The county has been historically referred to as "The Kingdom of Callaway" after an incident in which some residents confronted Union troops during the U.S. Civil War.

Callaway County is part of the Jefferson City, Missouri, Metropolitan Statistical Area.

Vineyards and wineries were first established in the area by German immigrants in the mid-19th century. Among the first mentioned in county histories are those around the southeastern Callaway settlement of Heilburn, a community neighboring Portland, on the Missouri River. Since the 1960s, there has been a revival of winemaking there and throughout Missouri.

The Callaway Nuclear Generating Station is located in Callaway County, near Fulton.

== History ==
This area was historically occupied by the Osage and other Native American peoples, some of whom migrated from east of the Ohio River Valley. Others emerged as cultures in this area, following thousands of years of settlement by indigenous peoples.

The first settlement in the county was in 1809 at Cote Sans Dessein along the Missouri River. Early leaders considered siting the first Missouri state capital in the territory between Wainwright and Tebbetts. Callaway County was organized in 1820 and was named after Captain James Callaway, who was killed by Native Americans. Elizabeth became the first county seat. Many of the villages and towns in the county today represent places where railroad stations existed in early years.

The early European-American settlement of Callaway County was largely by migrants from the Upper South states of Virginia, Kentucky, and Tennessee, with an influx of German immigrants starting in the 1830s, as was the case with other counties along the Missouri River. Some of them brought black slaves and enslavement practices with them, and quickly started cultivating hemp and tobacco, the same crops as were grown in Middle Tennessee and Kentucky. Given their culture and traditions, this area became known as Little Dixie. By 1860, enslaved people made up at least 25 percent of the county's population, higher than in most parts of the state.

Some pioneer families from Callaway and Lewis County, Missouri, moved to the West and became influential early settlers of the nascent state of California. Callaway families helped settle areas of California near the Oregon border, as they entered the state via the Oregon Trail, then southward toward San Francisco. Lewis County relatives helped build Sacramento and develop viticulture in the California Central Valley and areas north of San Francisco Bay. Some of these Missouri families, later key U.S./Unionist advocates and military personnel during the U.S. Civil War, held early local and statewide political offices in California.

On October 27, 1860, a woman known as "Slave Teney" was lynched by whites near Fulton after she confessed to killing the daughter of her owner.

In 1861, word arrived that Union troops had advanced to a nearby county. Colonel Jefferson F. Jones, from eastern Callaway County, assembled troops to protect the county. Forces were limited as many were already defending the country, but Jones marched the troops eastward to meet the approaching companies. The successful defense was merely an illusion. Tree logs, erected by the troops, resembled artillery in the shadows of campfires and deterred Union troops. Talks continued several days and secured a mutual ceasefire agreement between the United States of America and Callaway County. Elated from the successful defense, citizens proclaimed their county The Kingdom of Callaway, a reference that remains today. This truce with U.S./Union forces effectively allowed Confederate advocates to continue to operate under surveillance, not far from the Missouri government offices in Jefferson City. There may have been more than twice as many Confederate as U.S./Union troops in Callaway.

The 1862 Battle of Moore's Mill was the only significant Civil War battle in Callaway County.

The minutes of the U.S. Congressional hearing on the legitimacy of U.S. Civil-war-era elections in Callaway County include reports of substantial election meddling and voter harassment and intimidation, summarized in the 1867-68 Reports of Committees of the House of Representatives. It described the Confederate support in the county, citing prominent citizens, but the report also demonstrated that there was substantial county support for Union/U.S. government among citizens who were often intimidated into silence. Historians therefore cannot ascertain exact percentages of Union or Confederate sympathies in the county.

According to A Short History of Callaway County by Ovid Bell, the publisher of the Fulton Daily Sun Gazette, "Fulton was occupied during the greater part of the war by Union soldiers and militia, and Southern (i.e. Confederate) sympathizers were in constant fear of imprisonment and death." U.S. forces loyal to the Union were raised by Captains William T Snell, Henry Thomas, and JJP Johnson. They were reinforced by troops under General John B. Henderson from the town of Louisiana in Pike County, Missouri.

After the late-1860s Reconstruction era, an element of white residents in the state and county worked to restore white supremacy. Violence against Black people reached a peak around the turn of the 20th century, when whites lynched a total of four African Americans in the county. The victims included Ham Peterson in May 1884, killed because his brother spoke disrespectfully to whites; an unnamed African-American man killed by a mob in October 1884, after being accused of raping a young girl; and Emmett Divens, lynched August 15, 1895.

Other settlers in the Missouri River valley included German immigrants from the mid-19th century after the Revolutions of 1848 in the German states; they established a strong wine industry in the area and built towns with German-influenced architecture, concentrated substantially in counties south of Callaway and across the Missouri River, celebrated annually in the Maifest events in the Gasconade county seat, Hermann. Missouri was the second-largest wine-producing state nationally until Prohibition. Since the 1960s, numerous vineyards and wineries have been established again in the river valley, including Summit Lake Winery in Holts Summit. One definition of the Missouri Rhineland can be found in a Chicago Tribune article of September 2018.

Callaway has remained largely agricultural, economically, with its rich farmlands, yet borders Missouri's capital city and Lincoln University (Missouri) in Cole County, to the south, and the main University of Missouri campus in Columbia, 40 miles or less from the most populous areas of the county. Callaway County has for years hosted William Woods University and Westminster College in the county seat, Fulton, while Osage county, to the south, hosts the State Technical College of Missouri in Linn.

Residents and former residents of Callaway County are sometimes called "Callawegians".

== Geography ==
According to the U.S. Census Bureau, the county has a total area of 847 square miles (2,190 km^{2}), of which 835 square miles (2,160 km^{2}) is land and 13 square miles (34 km^{2}) (1.5%) is water.

The northern part of the county is relatively flat and devoid of large tracts of forests. The southern border of the county is the Missouri River, and the area is heavily forested over large hills and valleys. Cedar Creek makes up the bulk of the county's western border. Jefferson City lies across the Missouri River from the southwestern corner of the county.

=== Adjacent counties ===
- Audrain County (north)
- Montgomery County (east)
- Osage County (south)
- Cole County (southwest)
- Boone County (west)
- Gasconade County (southeast)

=== Major highways ===
- Interstate 70
- U.S. Route 40
- U.S. Route 54
- U.S. Route 63
- Route 94

=== National protected areas ===
- Big Muddy National Fish and Wildlife Refuge (part)
- Mark Twain National Forest (part)

== Climate ==
Callaway County

Climate chart (precipitation, max. and min. temperature)
J	F	M	A	M	J	J	A	S	O	N	D
52 1 −6	82 7 −5	109 13 3	219 21 8	147 21 13	111 25 17	68 27 21	83 27 21	95 25 14	109 19 9	44 13 6	69 3 −4
- █ Average max. and min. temperatures in °C
- █ Precipitation totals in mm
Imperial conversion
J	F	M	A	M	J	J	A	S	O	N	D
2 34 21	3.2 45 23	4.3 55 37	8.6 70 46	5.8 70 55	4.4 77 63	2.7 81 70	3.3 81 70	3.7 77 57	4.3 66 48	1.7 55 43	2.7 37 25
- █ Average max. and min. temperatures in °F
- █ Precipitation totals in inches

== Demographics ==
Historical population
Census	Pop.	Note	%±
1830	6,159		—
1840	11,765		91.0%
1850	13,827		17.5%
1860	17,449		26.2%
1870	19,202		10.0%
1880	23,670		23.3%
1890	25,131		6.2%
1900	25,984		3.4%
1910	24,400		−6.1%
1920	23,007		−5.7%
1930	19,923		−13.4%
1940	23,094		15.9%
1950	23,316		1.0%
1960	23,858		2.3%
1970	25,850		8.3%
1980	32,252		24.8%
1990	32,809		1.7%
2000	40,766		24.3%
2010	44,332		8.7%
2020	44,283		−0.1%
2025 (est.)	45,765	▲	3.3%
U.S. Decennial Census; 1790-1960 1900-1990; 1990-2000 2010-2020

=== 2020 census ===
As of the 2020 census, the county had a population of 44,283 and a median age of 39.5 years, with 21.6% of residents under the age of 18 and 16.9% aged 65 or older; for every 100 females there were 105.9 males, and for every 100 females age 18 and over there were 104.9 males. Thirty-nine point nine percent of residents lived in urban areas, while 60.1% lived in rural areas.

There were 16,596 households in the county, of which 30.1% had children under the age of 18 living with them and 23.4% had a female householder with no spouse or partner present; about 27.1% of all households were made up of individuals and 11.0% had someone living alone who was 65 years of age or older. There were 18,538 housing units, of which 10.5% were vacant; among occupied housing units, 72.8% were owner-occupied and 27.2% were renter-occupied, with a homeowner vacancy rate of 1.6% and a rental vacancy rate of 9.9%.

The racial and ethnic composition of the county reported in the 2020 census is summarized in the table below.

Callaway County, Missouri – Racial and ethnic composition Note: the US Census treats Hispanic/Latino as an ethnic category. This table excludes Latinos from the racial categories and assigns them to a separate category. Hispanics/Latinos may be of any race.
Race / Ethnicity (NH = Non-Hispanic)	Pop 1980	Pop 1990	Pop 2000	Pop 2010	Pop 2020	% 1980	% 1990	% 2000	% 2010	% 2020
White alone (NH)	30,158	30,832	37,191	40,350	38,453	93.51%	93.97%	91.23%	91.02%	86.83%
Black or African American alone (NH)	1,686	1,579	2,303	2,006	1,943	5.23%	4.81%	5.65%	4.52%	4.39%
Native American or Alaska Native alone (NH)	94	99	200	204	141	0.29%	0.30%	0.49%	0.46%	0.32%
Asian alone (NH)	90	119	207	236	222	0.28%	0.36%	0.51%	0.53%	0.50%
Native Hawaiian or Pacific Islander alone (NH)	x	x	3	15	30	x	x	0.01%	0.03%	0.07%
Other race alone (NH)	46	9	29	39	162	0.14%	0.03%	0.07%	0.09%	0.37%
Mixed race or Multiracial (NH)	x	x	456	775	2,367	x	x	1.12%	1.75%	5.35%
Hispanic or Latino (any race)	178	171	377	707	965	0.55%	0.52%	0.92%	1.59%	2.18%
Total	32,252	32,809	40,766	44,332	44,283	100.00%	100.00%	100.00%	100.00%	100.00%

=== 2000 census ===
As of the census of 2000, there were 40,766 people, 14,416 households, and 10,336 families residing in the county. The population density was 49 inhabitants per square mile (19/km^{2}). There were 16,167 housing units at an average density of 19 units per square mile (7.3/km^{2}). The racial makeup of the county was self-identified as 91.79% White, 5.66% Black or African American, 0.52% Native American, 0.52% Asian, 0.01% Pacific Islander, 0.30% from other races, and 1.21% from two or more races. Approximately 0.92% of the population identified as Hispanic or Latino of any race. 29.9% identified as of German ancestry, 22.0% as American, 9.1% as Irish (including Scots-Irish) and 9.1% as English ancestry.

There were 14,416 households, out of which 35.80% had children under the age of 18 living with them, 57.10% were married couples living together, 10.40% had a female householder with no husband present, and 28.30% were non-families. 23.00% of all households were made up of individuals, and 8.80% had someone living alone who was 65 years of age or older. The average household size was 2.56 and the average family size was 3.00.

In the county, the population was spread out, with 25.40% under the age of 18, 11.10% from 18 to 24, 31.00% from 25 to 44, 21.50% from 45 to 64, and 11.00% who were 65 years of age or older. The median age was 35 years. For every 100 females, there were 107.60 males. For every 100 females age 18 and over, there were 108.90 males.

The median income for a household in the county was $39,110, and the median income for a family was $44,474. Males had a median income of $29,574 versus $22,317 for females. The per capita income for the county was $17,005. About 6.00% of families and 8.50% of the population were below the poverty line, including 10.30% of those under age 18 and 8.30% of those age 65 or over.

=== Religion ===
According to the Association of Religion Data Archives County Membership Report (2010), Callaway County is sometimes regarded as being on the northern edge of the Bible Belt, with evangelical Protestantism being the most predominant religion. The most predominant denominations among residents in Callaway County who adhere to a religion are Southern Baptists (41.60%), Roman Catholics (14.00%), and United Methodists (9.41%).

== Education ==
School districts including sections of the county, no matter how slight, even if the relevant schools and/or administration buildings in another county:

- Community R-VI School District
- Fulton 58 School District
- Jefferson City Public Schools
- Mexico 59 School District
- Montgomery County R-II School District
- New Bloomfield R-III School District
- North Callaway County R-I School District
- South Callaway County R-II School District
- Wellsville-Middletown R-I School District

=== Public schools ===
- Fulton 58 School District – Fulton - See article for the school list
- New Bloomfield R-III School District – New Bloomfield
  - New Bloomfield Elementary School (PK-06)
  - New Bloomfield High School (07-12)
- North Callaway County R-I School District – Kingdom City
  - North Callaway Elementary School (PK-05)
  - North Callaway Middle School (6-08) – Auxvasse
  - North Callaway High School (09-12)
- South Callaway County R-II School District – Mokane
  - South Callaway County Early Childhood Education Center (PK-02)
  - South Callaway County Elementary School (03-05)
  - South Callaway County Middle School (06-08)
  - South Callaway High School (09-12)

Missouri School for the Deaf, a state-operated school, is in Missouri, within the county.

=== Private schools ===
- St. Peter Catholic School – Fulton (K-08) – Roman Catholic
- Kingdom Christian Academy – Fulton (PK-08) – Nondenominational Christian
- New Bloomfield Community Christian School – New Bloomfield (PK-06) – Nondenominational Christian

=== Post-secondary ===
- Westminster College - Fulton - A private, four-year Presbyterian university.
- William Woods University - Fulton - A private, four-year university.

=== Public libraries ===
- Callaway County Public Library

== Communities ==
=== Cities ===
- Auxvasse
- Fulton (county seat)
- Holts Summit
- Jefferson City (mostly in Cole County)
- Mokane
- New Bloomfield

=== Village ===
- Kingdom City

=== Census-designated place ===
- Tebbetts

=== Unincorporated communities ===
- Bachelor
- Boydsville
- Callaway
- Calwood
- Carrington
- Cedar City
- Concord
- Dixie
- Earl
- Guthrie
- Hams Prairie
- Hatton
- Hereford
- Millersburg
- Portland
- Readsville
- Reform
- Shamrock
- Steedman
- Stephens
- Toledo
- Wainwright
- Williamsburg
- Youngers
- Yucatan

=== Townships over time ===
Administrative Townships in Callaway County were created February 12, 1821, when there only two. Cote Sans Dessein Township generally included areas west of a line along the Auxvasse River (now called Auxvasse Creek) until it met about 91W45 longitude, where the boundary then continued straight north. Auxvasse Township (which never included the city of Auxvasse) included all areas east of that line, but that changed within about 3 months. On May 14, 1821, a new larger-than-today Round Prairie Township originally covered NW Callaway County, and the next day an Elizabeth (later renamed Fulton) Township was created in the center of the county, along with a later-subdivided Nine Mile Prairie Township that included NE Callaway County. More changes took place only a few years afterward with the creation of a larger-than-today Cedar Township November 13, 1824, that initially covered the SW corner of the county; then a new Bourbon Township (from northern Round Prairie) was created February 21, 1825; a later-subdivided Liberty Township February 24, 1838, and Jackson Township December 25, 1875, in north county; Calwood Township February 23, 1876; Caldwell Township June 5, 1883. These were followed between 1883 and 1897 by the creation of St. Aubert, Summit, and Guthrie townships in SW Callaway; and McCredie and Shamrock townships in northern Callaway. In the 2000s, West Fulton split from Fulton Township (later renamed East Fulton). More details on the boundaries, included cities and towns, and impact on previous boundaries are included in the articles below:

- Auxvasse
- Bourbon
- Caldwell
- Calwood
- Cedar
- Cleveland
- Cote Sans Dessein
- East Fulton
- Guthrie
- Jackson
- Liberty
- McCredie
- Nine Mile Prairie
- Round Prairie
- St. Aubert
- Shamrock
- Summit
- West Fulton

== Notable people ==
- William F. Baker, structural engineer for the Burj Khalifa
- Morris Frederick Bell, architect
- Henry Bellamann, poet and author of Kings Row
- Nick Cave, fabric sculptor, dancer, and performance artist
- Ike Clanton old west outlaw who fought the Earp Family in Tombstone, AZ
- John Ferrugia, journalist
- Tony Galbreath, running back in the NFL
- William Lincoln Garver, architect, author, and socialist politician
- Charlie James, Major League Baseball outfielder
- John Jameson, U.S. Representative from Missouri (1839-1841, 1843–1845, 1847–1849)
- Michael Kim, ESPN anchor and personality
- Bake McBride, Major League Baseball outfielder
- Ron McBride, running back in the National Football League
- Laura Redden Searing, also known as Howard Glyndon, deaf poet and writer
- Justin Smith, former NFL player
- Helen Stephens, 1936 Olympic Champion (The Fulton Flash)

== Politics ==
=== Local ===
The Republican Party completely controls politics at the local level in Callaway County, holding every elected position in the county.

Callaway County, Missouri

Elected countywide officials
Assessor	Jody Paschal	Republican
Auditor	Rylee Page	Republican
Circuit Clerk	Megan Morse	Republican
County Clerk	Ronda Miller	Republican
Collector	Sarah Gladman	Republican
Commissioner (presiding)	Gary Jungermann	Republican
Commissioner (district 1)	Curtis Warfield Jr	Republican
Commissioner (district 2)	Christopher Scott	Republican
Prosecuting Attorney	Chris Wilson	Republican
Public Administrator	D. Karen Digh Allen	Republican
Recorder	Christine Kleindienst	Republican
Sheriff	Darryl Maylee	Republican
Treasurer	Deborah Zerr	Republican

=== State ===
Past Gubernatorial Elections Results
Year	Republican	Democratic	Third Parties
2024	71.61% 15,250	25.42% 5,413	2.97% 633
2020	70.85% 14,950	26.59% 5,611	2.56% 540
2016	57.95% 11,149	38.15% 7,340	3.89% 749
2012	52.30% 9,486	44.17% 8,012	3.53% 640
2008	49.78% 9,596	48.63% 9,375	1.59% 306
2004	57.27% 10,153	41.59% 7,373	1.13% 201
2000	43.62% 6,641	53.40% 8,129	2.98% 453
1996	32.91% 4,314	63.91% 8,379	3.18% 417

Callaway County is split between two legislative districts in the Missouri House of Representatives, both of which are held by Republicans.

- District 43 — Kent Haden (R-Mexico). Consists of the communities of Auxvasse, Portland, Steedman, and Williamsburg.

Missouri House of Representatives — District 43 — Callaway County (2020)
Party	Candidate	Votes	%	±%
Republican	Kent Haden	4,305	100.00%	+25.14

Missouri House of Representatives — District 43 — Callaway County (2018)
Party	Candidate	Votes	%	±%
Republican	Kent Haden	2,983	74.86%	+1.93
Democratic	Jamie Blair	1,002	25.14%	−1.93

- District 49 — Travis Fitzwater (R-Holts Summit). Consists of the communities of Fulton, Holts Summit, Kingdom City, Lake Mykee Town, Mokane, New Bloomfield, and Tebbetts.

Missouri House of Representatives — District 49 — Callaway County (2020)
Party	Candidate	Votes	%	±%
Republican	Travis Fitzwater	13,918	100.00%	+33.00

Missouri House of Representatives — District 49 — Callaway County (2018)
Party	Candidate	Votes	%	±%
Republican	Travis Fitzwater	8,691	67.00%	−33.00
Democratic	Lisa Buhr	4,281	33.00%	+33.00

All of Callaway County is a part of Missouri's 10th District in the Missouri Senate and is currently represented by Jeanie Riddle (R-Mokane).

Missouri Senate — District 10 — Callaway County (2018)
Party	Candidate	Votes	%	±%
Republican	Jeanie Riddle	12,171	71.46%	−2.20
Democratic	Ayanna Shivers	4,862	28.55%	+2.21

Missouri Senate — District 10 — Callaway County (2014)
Party	Candidate	Votes	%	±%
Republican	Jeanie Riddle	7,993	73.66%	
Democratic	Ed Schieffer	2,858	26.34%	

=== Federal ===
All of Callaway County is included in Missouri's 3rd Congressional District and is currently represented by Blaine Luetkemeyer (R-St. Elizabeth) in the U.S. House of Representatives. Luetkemeyer was elected to a seventh term in 2020 over Democratic challenger Megan Rezabek.

U.S. House of Representatives — Missouri’s 3rd Congressional District — Callaway County (2020)
Party	Candidate	Votes	%	±%
Republican	Blaine Luetkemeyer	15,349	73.76%	+3.97
Democratic	Megan Rezabek	4,974	23.90%	−4.21
Libertarian	Leonard J. Steinman II	450	2.16%	+0.06
	Write-ins	37	0.18%	

U.S. House of Representatives — Missouri's 3rd Congressional District — Callaway County (2018)
Party	Candidate	Votes	%	±%
Republican	Blaine Luetkemeyer	11,916	69.79%	−1.96
Democratic	Katy Geppert	4,799	28.11%	+4.32
Libertarian	Donald V. Stolle	359	2.10%	−1.07

Callaway County, along with the rest of the state of Missouri, is represented in the U.S. Senate by Josh Hawley (R-Columbia) and Roy Blunt (R-Strafford).

U.S. Senate – Class I – Callaway County (2018)
Party	Candidate	Votes	%	±%
Republican	Josh Hawley	10,661	62.44%	+14.39
Democratic	Claire McCaskill	5,705	33.41%	−10.78
Independent	Craig O'Dear	322	1.89%	
Libertarian	Japheth Campbell	271	1.59%	−6.17
Green	Jo Crain	116	0.68%	+0.68

Blunt was elected to a second term in 2016 over then-Missouri Secretary of State Jason Kander.

U.S. Senate — Class III — Callaway County (2016)
Party	Candidate	Votes	%	±%
Republican	Roy Blunt	10,983	57.24%	+9.19
Democratic	Jason Kander	7.084	36.92%	−7.27
Libertarian	Jonathan Dine	534	2.78%	−4.98
Green	Johnathan McFarland	238	1.24%	+1.24
Constitution	Fred Ryman	347	1.81%	+1.81

==== Political culture ====
United States presidential election results for Callaway County, Missouri
Year	Republican		Democratic		Third party(ies)	
Year	No.	%	No.	%	No.	%
1888	1,624	29.18%	3,912	70.30%	29	0.52%
1892	1,453	27.44%	3,620	68.35%	223	4.21%
1896	1,849	29.45%	4,358	69.42%	71	1.13%
1900	1,864	30.79%	4,133	68.28%	56	0.93%
1904	1,765	32.29%	3,596	65.79%	105	1.92%
1908	1,911	32.69%	3,878	66.35%	56	0.96%
1912	1,525	28.23%	3,544	65.61%	333	6.16%
1916	2,009	33.94%	3,882	65.59%	28	0.47%
1920	3,274	35.06%	6,035	64.62%	30	0.32%
1924	2,799	31.68%	5,904	66.82%	133	1.51%
1928	3,269	38.75%	5,153	61.08%	15	0.18%
1932	2,079	22.67%	7,042	76.78%	51	0.56%
1936	3,112	30.23%	7,160	69.56%	21	0.20%
1940	3,574	33.22%	7,162	66.58%	21	0.20%
1944	3,143	35.22%	5,757	64.51%	24	0.27%
1948	2,433	28.10%	6,215	71.78%	10	0.12%
1952	3,818	40.96%	5,484	58.83%	19	0.20%
1956	3,572	40.88%	5,165	59.12%	0	0.00%
1960	4,054	43.14%	5,344	56.86%	0	0.00%
1964	2,983	33.52%	5,916	66.48%	0	0.00%
1968	4,277	46.03%	3,738	40.23%	1,276	13.73%
1972	6,313	67.53%	3,036	32.47%	0	0.00%
1976	5,115	50.85%	4,843	48.15%	101	1.00%
1980	6,755	52.63%	5,560	43.32%	520	4.05%
1984	8,262	65.63%	4,327	34.37%	0	0.00%
1988	6,687	56.01%	5,209	43.63%	42	0.35%
1992	4,880	34.90%	5,799	41.48%	3,302	23.62%
1996	5,567	42.38%	5,880	44.76%	1,690	12.86%
2000	8,238	53.81%	6,708	43.82%	362	2.36%
2004	11,108	62.50%	6,559	36.90%	106	0.60%
2008	11,389	58.81%	7,580	39.14%	397	2.05%
2012	11,745	64.42%	6,071	33.30%	416	2.28%
2016	13,057	67.54%	4,989	25.81%	1,287	6.66%
2020	14,815	70.07%	5,870	27.76%	459	2.17%
2024	15,206	70.87%	5,926	27.62%	323	1.51%

At the presidential level, Callaway County has become solidly Republican in recent years despite being a Democratic stronghold for much of its history. Callaway County strongly favored Donald Trump in both 2016 and 2020. Bill Clinton was the last Democratic presidential nominee to carry Callaway County in 1996 with a plurality of the vote, and a Democrat hasn't won majority support from the county's voters in a presidential election since Lyndon Johnson in 1964.

Like most rural areas throughout Missouri, voters in Callaway County generally adhere to socially and culturally conservative principles which tend to influence their Republican leanings. Despite Callaway County's longstanding tradition of supporting socially conservative platforms, voters in the county have a penchant for advancing populist causes. In 2018, Missourians voted on a proposition (Proposition A) concerning right to work, the outcome of which ultimately reversed the right to work legislation passed in the state the previous year. 62.63% of Callaway County voters cast their ballots to overturn the law.

=== Missouri presidential preference primaries ===
==== 2020 ====
The 2020 presidential primaries for both the Democratic and Republican parties were held in Missouri on March 10. On the Democratic side, former Vice President Joe Biden (D-Delaware) both won statewide and carried Callaway County by a wide margin. Biden went on to defeat President Donald Trump in the general election.

Missouri Democratic Presidential Primary – Callaway County (2020)
Party	Candidate	Votes	%	±%
Democratic	Joe Biden	2,139	61.57	
Democratic	Bernie Sanders	1,102	31.72	
Democratic	Tulsi Gabbard	47	1.35	
Democratic	Others/Uncommitted	186	5.35	

Incumbent President Donald Trump (R-Florida) faced a primary challenge from former Massachusetts Governor Bill Weld, but won both Callaway County and statewide by overwhelming margins.

Missouri Republican Presidential Primary – Callaway County (2020)
Party	Candidate	Votes	%	±%
Republican	Donald Trump	2,580	97.36	
Republican	Bill Weld	20	0.76	
Republican	Others/Uncommitted	50	1.89	

==== 2016 ====
The 2016 presidential primaries for both the Republican and Democratic parties were held in Missouri on March 15. Businessman Donald Trump (R-New York) narrowly won the state overall, but Senator Ted Cruz (R-Texas) carried a plurality in Callaway County. Trump went on to win the nomination and the presidency.

Missouri Republican Presidential Primary – Callaway County (2016)
Party	Candidate	Votes	%	±%
Republican	Ted Cruz	3,262	43.22	
Republican	Donald Trump	3,142	41.63	
Republican	John Kasich	584	7.74	
Republican	Marco Rubio	366	4.85	
Republican	Others/Uncommitted	193	2.56	

On the Democratic side, former Secretary of State Hillary Clinton (D-New York) narrowly won statewide, but Senator Bernie Sanders (I-Vermont) carried a majority of the vote in Callaway County.

Missouri Democratic Presidential Primary – Callaway County (2016)
Party	Candidate	Votes	%	±%
Democratic	Bernie Sanders	1,679	54.23	
Democratic	Hillary Clinton	1,378	44.51	
Democratic	Others/Uncommitted	39	1.26	

==== 2012 ====
The 2012 Missouri Republican Presidential Primary's results were nonbinding on the state's national convention delegates. Voters in Callaway County supported former U.S. Senator Rick Santorum (R-Pennsylvania), who finished first in the state at large, but eventually lost the nomination to former Governor Mitt Romney (R-Massachusetts). Delegates to the congressional district and state conventions were chosen at a county caucus, which selected a delegation favoring Romney. Incumbent President Barack Obama easily won the Missouri Democratic Primary and renomination. He defeated Romney in the general election.

==== 2008 ====
In 2008, the Missouri Republican Presidential Primary was closely contested, with Senator John McCain (R-Arizona) prevailing and eventually winning the nomination. However, former Governor Mike Huckabee (R-Arkansas) won a plurality in Callaway County.

Missouri Republican Presidential Primary – Callaway County (2008)
Party	Candidate	Votes	%	±%
Republican	Mike Huckabee	1,517	34.14	
Republican	Mitt Romney	1,457	32.79	
Republican	John McCain	1,203	27.08	
Republican	Ron Paul	196	4.41	
Republican	Others/Uncommitted	70	1.58	

Then-Senator Hillary Clinton (D-New York) received more votes than any candidate from either party in Callaway County during the 2008 presidential primary. Despite initial reports that Clinton had won Missouri, Barack Obama (D-Illinois), also a Senator at the time, narrowly defeated her statewide and later became that year's Democratic nominee, going on to win the presidency.

Missouri Democratic Presidential Primary – Callaway County (2008)
Party	Candidate	Votes	%	±%
Democratic	Hillary Clinton	2,701	54.71	
Democratic	Barack Obama	2,037	41.26	
Democratic	Others/Uncommitted	199	4.04	

== See also ==
- National Register of Historic Places listings in Callaway County, Missouri
