= Shamrock (disambiguation) =

A shamrock is a three leaf clover (or sometimes other plants with similar leaves) that is a symbol of Ireland.

Shamrock, Sham Rock or Shamrocks may also refer to:

== Music ==
- Sham Rock, an Irish novelty folk band
- Shamrock (Filipino band), an alternative band from the Philippines
- Sham Rock, an album by Beatnik Turtle
- "Shamrock" (song), a 2006 UVERworld single
- "Shamrock", a 1962 song by Calvin Boze
- "Shamrock", a 1968 song by Nathan Abshire

== Film ==
- Shamrock (film), a 1953 Finnish anthology film

== Places ==
=== United States ===
- Shamrock, Florida, an unincorporated community
- Shamrock Township, Aitkin County, Minnesota
- Shamrock, Missouri, an unincorporated community
- Shamrock Township, Callaway County, Missouri
- Shamrock Township, Holt County, Nebraska
- Shamrock, Oklahoma, an unincorporated community
- Shamrock, Texas, a city
- Shamrock, Wisconsin, an unincorporated community

=== Canada ===
- Rural Municipality of Shamrock No. 134, Saskatchewan
  - Shamrock, Saskatchewan, a village

== Sports ==
=== Australia ===
- Dundas Shamrocks Junior Rugby League Football Club, Balmain, Australia

=== Canada ===
- Erin Shamrocks, a junior ice hockey team in Ontario
- Victoria Shamrocks, a box lacrosse team in British Columbia
- Montreal Shamrocks GAA
- Parry Sound Shamrocks, a former junior ice hockey team in Ontario
- Montreal Shamrocks, a former ice hockey team
- Hespeler Shamrocks (2018–), junior ice hockey team in Simcoe, Ontario
- Shamrock Field, former GAA sports venue in St. John's, Newfoundland

=== Ireland ===
- Shamrock Rovers F.C., Tallaght, South Dublin
- Cortoon Shamrocks GAA
- Raheny Shamrock Athletic Club, Dublin
- Shamrocks GAA (Cork)

=== Northern Ireland ===
- Ballinderry Shamrocks GAC, County Londonderry
- Shamrock F.C., Ardoyne, Belfast

=== United States ===
- Boston Jr. Shamrocks, a junior ice hockey team
- South Carolina Shamrocks, a former soccer team
- Boston Shamrocks (1971–72), alias of the Washington Generals
- St. Louis Shamrocks, a former soccer team
- St. Louis Shamrocks (1935-1938), a former soccer team
- Boston Shamrocks (AFL), a former American Football League
- Pittsburgh Shamrocks, a former ice hockey team
- Chicago Shamrocks, a former ice hockey team

== Naval vessels ==
- HMS Shamrock, a number of British ships
- USS Shamrock, a Union Navy gunboat during the American Civil War

== Transport ==
=== Land ===
- Shamrock Buses, a bus company based in Poole, Dorset, UK
- Shamrock (car), a car produced in Ireland during the 1950s
- 1893 Shamrock, an early Canadian car

=== Sea ===
- Shamrock (yacht), an unsuccessful challenger for the 1899 America's Cup
- Shamrock II, an unsuccessful challenger for the 1901 America's Cup
- Shamrock III, an unsuccessful challenger for the 1903 America's Cup
- Shamrock IV, an unsuccessful challenger in the 1920 America's Cup
- Shamrock V, an unsuccessful challenger in the 1929 America's Cup
- The Shamrock, an Alaskan gold mining dredge featured on Bering Sea Gold: Under The Ice reality Television show
- Shamrock, a Tamar barge sailing vessel for carrying cargo

=== Air ===
- Shamrock, the callsign of airline Aer Lingus
- Shamrock Field, alternative name for Brooklyn Airport, public use airport in Michigan

== People ==
- Billey Shamrock, Swedish entertainer
- Ken Shamrock (born 1964), former wrestler / mixed martial artist
- Frank Shamrock (born 1972), former mixed martial artist
- "Ryan Shamrock", Alicia Webb's wrestling name from 1989 to 1998

== Fictional characters ==
- Shamrock (comics), a minor Marvel Comics superhero
- Sean "Shamrock" McGinty, a member of the Barksdale Organization on the television series The Wire
- Marcus Lampert "Shamrock", a character on Ace Combat 6: Fires of Liberation

== Businesses ==
- Shamrock Farms, a dairy farm in Arizona
- Shamrock Foods, an Irish food brand
- Shamrock Holdings, a company that manages Roy Edward Disney's personal holdings
- Shamrock Hotel or Shamrock Hilton, a hotel in Houston, Texas
- Shamrock Oil Company

== Other uses ==
- Shamrocks, a solitaire card game
- Shamrock Club of Wisconsin
- Shamrock Organization, an organizational structure
- Operation Shamrock, a plan to bring orphaned German children to Ireland from post-World War II Germany
- Project SHAMROCK, a Cold-War-era US espionage exercise
- The Shamrock, a 1777 Irish play or pasticcio opera by John O'Keeffe
- The Shamrock (newspaper), Irish literary newspaper
- Shamrock (film), a 1953 Finnish anthology film

== See also ==
- Oxalis regnellii, sometimes called "false shamrock"
- Trigonella suavissima, sometimes called "Australian shamrock"
