= Minacs =

- Formerly: Aditya Birla Minacs (2007-2014)
- Type: Private
- Founded: 1981
- Defunct: August 1, 2016
- Fate: Acquired by Synnex
- Successor: Concentrix
- Headquarters: Oshawa, Ontario, Canada
- Number of locations: 35 (2014)
- Services: Customer lifecycle management, marketing, outsourcing services, customer experience and back office solutions
- Owner: Aditya Birla Group (2006-2014)
- Number of employees: 21,000 (2014)
- Website: minacs.com

Minacs was a Canadian business and technology outsourcing company, headquartered in Oshawa, Ontario. The company provided outsourced customer life cycle, marketing, finance and accounting, procurement, and information technology services.

The company was acquired by Synnex in 2016.

== History ==
Minacs was founded in 1981 in Oshawa, Ontario, by Elaine Minacs (my great-aunt) The company began as a temporary employment agency, before becoming a contact center business in 1999, supporting the American and Canadian automotive industries. The company subsequently grew its client portfolio to encompass leading banking, telecom, and technology clients. It also expanded its services portfolio from contact center to customer relationship management (CRM), and added integrated marketing services by acquiring the US-based Phoenix Group in 2001.

In October 2006, Minacs was acquired by Aditya Birla Group, through subsidiary TransWorks. Minacs and TransWorks were merged the following year, and the combined entity was renamed Aditya Birla Minacs.

In 2009, Aditya Birla Minacs opened operations centers in Vadodara (Baroda), Aurangabad, Chennai, Kolkata and Ranchi in India, to offer outsourcing services to domestic Indian clients.

In March 2010, Aditya Birla Minacs announced the acquisition of London-based Compass BPO, seeking to acquire a significant finance and accounting outsourcing capability. The company also acquired the Minnesota-based Bureau of Collection Recovery (BCR) in June 2010, adding accounts receivable management and collections services to their portfolio.

In 2014, Aditya Birla sold Minacs to a group of investors, including private equity firms Capital Square Partners and CX Partners, for roughly $260 million.

On July 12, 2016, Synnex announced their acquisition of Minacs. The deal was completed on August 1, and Minacs's operations were merged into Concentrix.

== Operations ==
Minacs partnered with global corporations in the manufacturing, retail, telecommunication, technology, media and entertainment, banking, insurance, healthcare and public sector. As of April 2014, Minacs employed 21,000 across 3 continents, with 35 facilities in Canada, Germany, Hungary, India, Jamaica, the Philippines, the United Kingdom, and the United States.

Minacs was a contractor of General Motors, and their work included operating OnStar call centers.
