= Portfolio career =

Type of career path

A portfolio career comprises a variety of roles rather than one job at a single organisation. It can be a career that combines multiple paid and/or voluntary roles. The philosopher and organisational behaviourist Charles Handy popularised the "portfolio" concept in works like his 1994 book The Empty Raincoat. Handy's recognition of the portfolio career-path came about when he realised that individuals would be required to develop portable skillsets to meet the needs of a fast-moving future workplace. His prediction foresaw what is now known as the gig economy.

In 2006 journalist Penelope Trunk wrote on her blog that the rise of portfolio careers came "as members of Generation X entered the workforce. Two-thirds of them were looking for an alternative to full-time employment as a more efficient path to self-discovery and finding the right career."

Portfolio careers are often found in the creative industries where freelancing is the norm. Economic conditions mean many are now actively choosing to pursue portfolio careers to make the most of their earning potential.

== Advantages ==
Advantages of a portfolio career include work–life balance, job security, flexibility, variety, multiple income streams and the ability to pursue individual interest areas.

Ben Legg, CEO of UK-based social enterprise The Portfolio Collective, said: "A portfolio career is much more resilient than having one permanent role. In addition to having multiple income sources, your work is always evolving, as old clients roll off and you win new ones."

There are benefits for employers, too. Mike Bank, Director of FlexRoles.com, said: "Flex or Fractional roles offer numerous advantages for businesses operating in today's fast-paced, competitive environment... Portfolio professionals bring fresh perspectives and diverse experiences to the table. Their ability to work across different industries and projects fuels innovation, creativity, and outside-the-box thinking."

== Disadvantages ==
Disadvantages are the lack of stability, traditional career progression, fluctuation of earnings and a lack of identity.

Herminia Ibarra, the Charles Handy Professor of Organisational Behaviour at London Business School, argues that the portfolio careerist is faced with the problem of identity. "There is no easy label, no shorthand. Inevitably, one resorts to explaining oneself with a laundry list, when the culturally appropriate answer is what the psychologist Kenneth Gergen called the progressive narrative: a story of hard work and linear ascent culminating in a recognisably top role."

== Scale ==
The Centre for Research on Self Employment, a London-based think tank, estimates that 250,000 UK workers define their work as a portfolio career. A study by the Henley Business School determined that in the United Kingdom 25 per cent of workers had a side job. Ben Legg, CEO of UK-based social enterprise The Portfolio Collective, believes this number is likely to be in the millions by 2030.

Some 45 per cent of working Americans report having a side job, making them portfolio careerists. In the United Kingdom 60 per cent of students and graduates said they had a side job and 43 per cent needed the extra income to pay their rent.

Portfolio careers may become more common as the world economy and job market work to recover from the COVID-19 pandemic.

== Issues ==
Sean Smith, a retired vice-principal, argues that "a new economy that requires aspirational young people to effectively become captains of their own cottage industries will require schools to think very differently". He believes that schools will need to redefine how they view work readiness and change the expectations of young people as they prepare for work.

Tara Fenwick, Emeritus Professor of Professional Education in the School of Education at the University of Stirling, thinks "workers may need to educate clients about the nature of portfolio work; and employers who contract to portfolio workers must take more responsibility for negotiating fair contracts that are sensitive to overwork and unfair time pressures".

== Nomenclature ==
Young portfolio careerists are sometimes known as slashies or solopreneurs.

== See also ==
- Part-time contract
- Side job
- Gig worker
- Fractional Work
- Fractional Executive
