= Shamrock Township =

Shamrock Township may refer to the following places in the United States:

- Shamrock Township, Aitkin County, Minnesota
- Shamrock Township, Callaway County, Missouri
- Shamrock Township, Holt County, Nebraska

== See also ==
- Shamrock (disambiguation)
