= Thomas W. Cahill =

American soccer administrator and coach

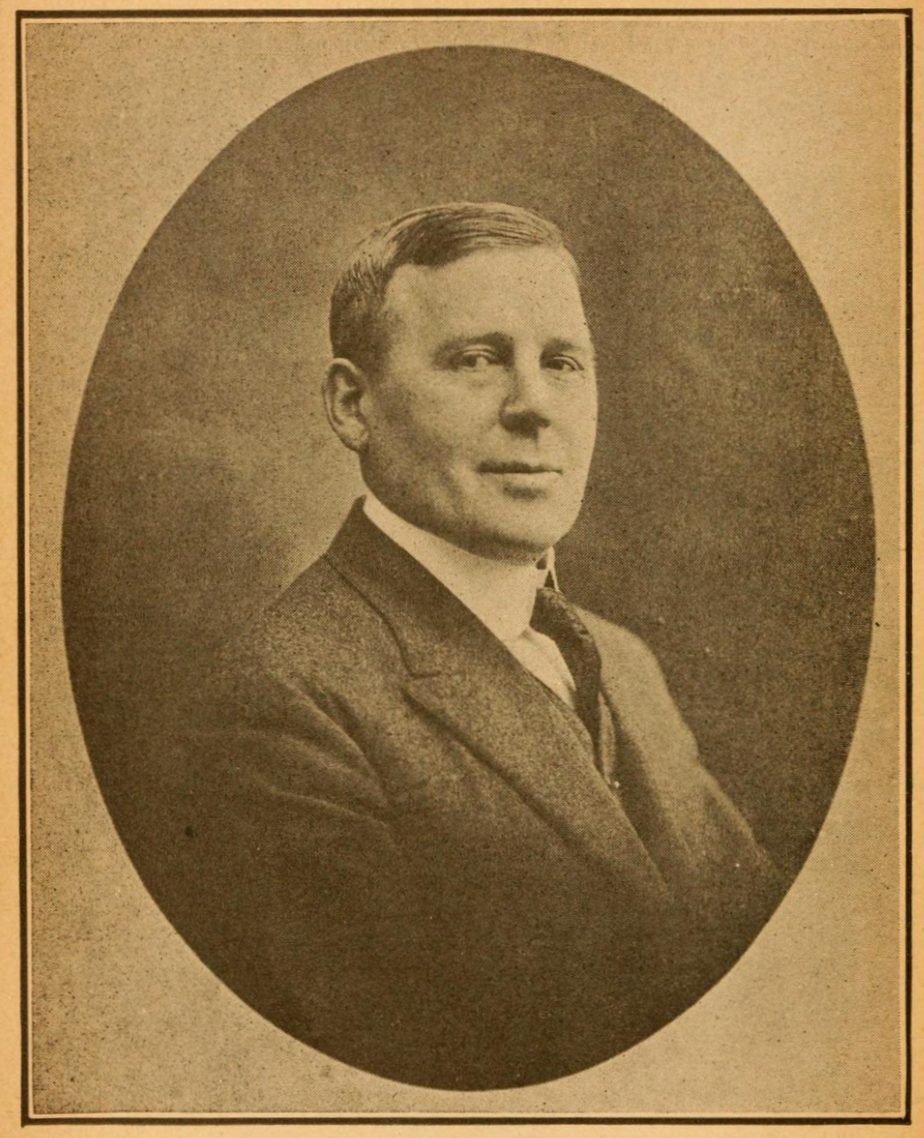
- Portrait of Cahill for Spalding's Official "Soccer" Football Guide, 1918-19 edition.
- Born: Thomas William Cahill; December 25, 1864; New York City, New York, United States
- Died: September 29, 1951 (aged 86); South Orange, New Jersey, United States
- Occupations: Sports administrator, editor
- Known for: Founding United States Football Association
- Notable work: Spalding's Athletic Library

Thomas William Cahill (December 25, 1864 — September 29, 1951) was one of the founding fathers of soccer in the United States, and is considered the most important administrator in U.S. Soccer before World War II. Cahill formed the United States Football Association in 1913, which later became the United States Soccer Federation. In 1916 he became the first coach of the United States men's national soccer team. Cahill was enshrined in the U.S. National Soccer Hall of Fame in 1950.

== Early life ==
Thomas Cahill was born in New York City, but moved to St. Louis, Missouri in 1871. He was of Irish descent. He attended St. Louis University and built a reputation as one of the pre-eminent amateur athletes in the country. Originally favoring running and baseball, he became interested in soccer after witnessing a game involving a team visiting from Toronto.

In 1897, Cahill founded St. Louis Shamrocks which competed in the St. Louis Association Foot Ball League. They won the league title in 1899 and 1900. Although he owned Shamrocks, he also managed several other teams including St. Louis Spalding's in 1903-04 and Diel F.C. during the 1904–05 season.

== Soccer in the United States ==
Cahill returned to the East Coast and settled in Newark, New Jersey in 1910.

Cahill decided to establish a national governing body for soccer. He was the secretary and one of the founders of the American Amateur Football Association, one of the governing bodies vying for sole status as the nationally recognized governing body. He traveled to Stockholm in 1912 to attend FIFA's ninth annual congress where he applied for the American Amateur Football Association, to become the U.S. national governing body. Cahill's efforts were opposed by a representative from the American Football Association, a rival also attempting to become the nationally recognized body. FIFA did not immediately resolve the dispute, and urged Cahill and the AAFA to work with the AFA to create a solution.

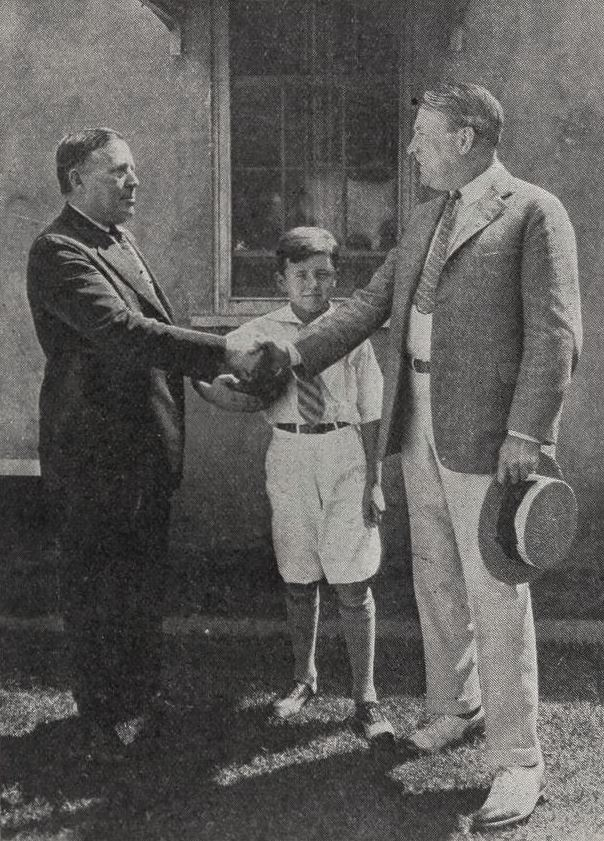
Cahill (left) with film director King Baggot and his son, from a 1923 magazine

Cahill ultimately achieved his goal, however, when the United States Football Association was formed on April 5, 1913, at a meeting at the Astor House hotel in New York. The USFA later became the United States Soccer Federation. Cahill served three separate terms as the Executive Secretary of the USFA; 1913–1921, 1923–1924 and a final term in 1928.

Cahill was the editor of Spalding's annual Official Soccer Football Guide from 1912 to 1924.

In 1916 he became the first coach of the United States men's national soccer team, taking a team for a tour of Scandinavia. The United States played its first official international match under the auspices of U.S. Soccer on August 20, 1916, against Sweden in Stockholm, which the U.S. won 3–2, with goals from Dick Spalding, Charles Ellis and Harry Cooper.

In 1921 Cahill was instrumental in forming the American Soccer League, which was the first serious attempt to establish a professional league in the United States. He served as the organization's secretary from 1921 to 1926. The American Soccer League was established in 1921 by the merger of teams from the National Association Football League and the Southern New England Soccer League. For several years The ASL's popularity rivaled the popularity of the National Football League. Disputes with the United States Football Association and the onset of the Great Depression in 1929 led to the league's collapse in spring 1933.

Cahill's star faded, however. He was passed over for manager of the U.S. national team at the 1928 Olympics and the 1930 World Cup.

Cahill died in 1951 in South Orange, New Jersey.

== Works ==
Cahill was editor of several books in the Spalding Athletic Library collection which was published by American Sports Publishing Co.

- Cahill, Thomas W., ed. (1912). Spalding's Official Association "Soccer" Foot Ball Guide: 1912. New York: American Sports Publishing Co.
- Cahill, Thomas W., ed. (1913). Spalding's Official Association "Soccer" Foot Ball Guide: 1913. New York: American Sports Publishing Co.
- Cahill, Thomas W., ed. (1914). Spalding's Official "Soccer" Foot Ball Guide: 1914-15. New York: American Sports Publishing Co.
- Cahill, Thomas W., ed. (1915). Spalding's Official "Soccer" Football Guide: 1915-16. New York: American Sports Publishing Co.
- Cahill, Thomas W., ed. (1916). Spalding's Official "Soccer" Football Guide: 1916-17. New York: American Sports Publishing Co.
- Cahill, Thomas W., ed. (1917). Spalding's Official "Soccer" Football Guide: 1917-18. New York: American Sports Publishing Co.
- Cahill, Thomas W., ed. (1918). Spalding's Official "Soccer" Football Guide: 1918-19. New York: American Sports Publishing Co.
- Cahill, Thomas W., ed. (1919). Spalding's Official "Soccer" Football Guide: 1919-20. New York: American Sports Publishing Co.
- Cahill, Thomas W., ed. (1921). Spalding's Official "Soccer" Football Guide 1921-22. New York: American Sports Publishing Co.
- Cahill, Thomas W., ed. (1922). Spalding's Official "Soccer" Football Guide: 1922-23. New York: American Sports Publishing Co.
- Cahill, Thomas W., ed. (1923). Spalding's Official "Soccer" Football Guide: 1923-24. New York: American Sports Publishing Co.
- Spalding Athletic Library collection, Official soccer football guide, 1914-1915
