= Master of Music =

First graduate degree in music, awarded by universities and music conservatories

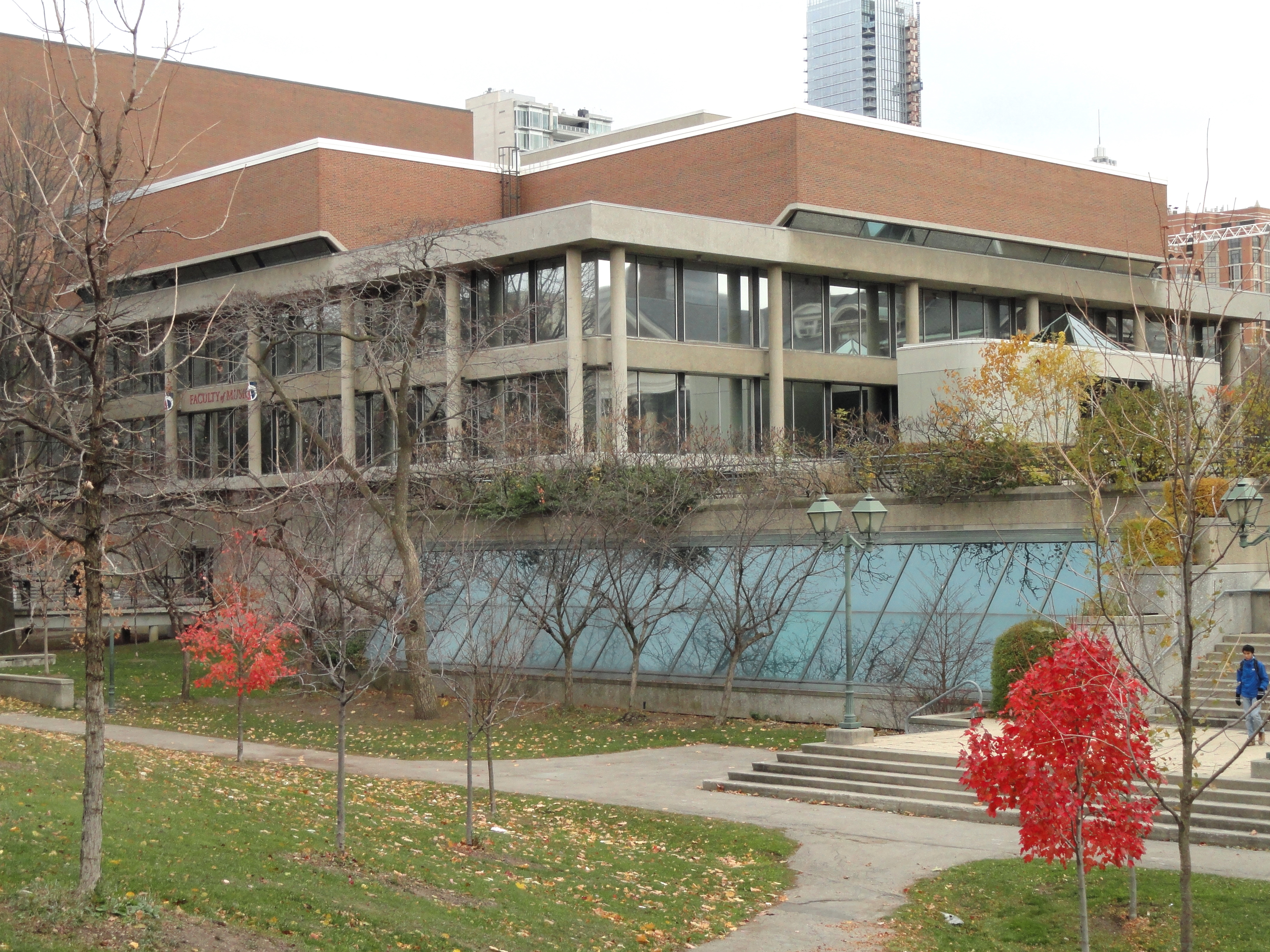
The Faculty of Music at the University of Toronto offers a Master of Music in Composition, Music Technology and Digital Media, Instrumental (solo piano, woodwinds, brass, percussion, strings), Collaborative Piano, Conducting, Jazz Performance, Opera, Piano Pedagogy, Voice, and Vocal Pedagogy. The first program for the degree was introduced in 1954.

The Master of Music (MM or MMus) is a graduate degree in music awarded by universities and conservatories. The MM combines advanced studies in an applied area of specialization (usually performance in singing or instrument playing, composition, or conducting) with graduate-level academic study in subjects such as music history, music theory, or music pedagogy. The degree, which takes one or two years of full-time study to complete, prepares students to be professional performers, conductors, and composers, according to their area of specialization. The MM is often required as the minimum teaching credential for university, college, and conservatory instrumental or vocal teaching positions.

== Types ==
The MM is widely available in performance (sometimes with a specialization in music teaching/pedagogy and/or music literature), composition, conducting, and music education. The music education degree may also be awarded as a more specifically titled Master of Music Education (MME or MMEd). The master's in music theory, musicology (commonly called "music history"), and ethnomusicology is typically the Master of Arts (MA). Nevertheless, some universities in the UK (e.g. Sheffield University) utilize the MM as a special research degree, in which the student undertakes original research and prepares a written thesis or similar document.

Programs focusing on preparing musicians for careers in sacred music for churches and houses of worship may alternatively be called Master of Sacred Music (MSM).

== Components of degree ==
=== Applied studies and courses ===
One of the major differences between a typical MA degree and the MM is that whereas MA degree students often undertake original research and prepare and submit a thesis or similar research document, MM students focus on practical, applied areas, as set out in their MM area of specialization, which are typically instrumental or vocal performance, composition of new music, or conducting. The latter may focus on orchestral conducting, choral conducting, or a combination of both.

In MM programs, the student spends intensive lesson time with a professor. For singers and instrumentalists, this is with a voice and instrument professor, respectively. For composition students, they take coaching sessions with composer-professors. For conducting students, they get conducting coaching from a conductor-professor at the university. MM students typically complete applied studies, such as lessons with a professor, and take courses within their area of specialization. In many MM programs, all of the different MM streams (e.g., performance, composition, conducting) take a common core of music theory and music history courses, as these core courses are a necessary background for all three careers. The different streams may also have different required courses for each stream. For example, vocal performance students may be required to take an opera or art song class; orchestral instrumentalists may be required to take an orchestral excerpts or orchestral audition preparation class; composition students may be required to take composition courses; and conducting students may be required to take conducting, score-reading, or piano classes.

Some programs additionally require a sub-specialization in a cognate area, such as music history or performance practice, which contributes to their area of specialization. For example, a student doing an MM in Baroque violin might do a sub-specialization in Baroque music history (e.g., on historically authentic performance). Some institutions permit MM students to do a sub-specialization in a field outside music that contributes to their professional and academic goals. For example, a student completing a MM in piano pedagogy may be able to do a sub-specialization in the psychology of learning in the university's department of psychology or take a sub-specialization in educational methods in the university's department of education. Doing sub-specializations outside the faculty of music typically requires the approval of both the faculty of music and the other faculty (e.g., psychology, education, etc.).

=== Recitals and comprehensive exams ===
The last stage of the MM is usually the performance of one or two recitals and completion of comprehensive exams. Most programs require that the recitals include advanced-grade pieces that are drawn from the different eras of music history, such as Baroque-era solo suites (late 17th to mid 18th century), a Classical-era (mid to late 18th century) sonata or concerto; a Romantic-era (19th century) concerto or solo; and a Contemporary era (20th and 21st century) piece. The specific components of the recital vary between schools. Some programs allow students to include chamber pieces, in which the student plays a major role as part of a chamber group, for some of the pieces.

In some schools, students are required to give a lecture for one or both of the recitals, in which they explain the historical context or music theory or compositional issues involved in the pieces. This approach, called a lecture-recital, is designed to give students experience explaining and contextualizing the pieces or songs they perform. This skill is important for performers because many also teach or coach students, and some will go on to become professors, where they may be required to give lectures on music history, theory, or composition.

Some MM programs require students to pass comprehensive exams on their area of specialization and subjects such as music history and music theory. The goal of this exam is to ensure that the student has obtained a well-rounded knowledge and understanding that extends beyond their specialization. Since the MM is the standard minimum credential to teach applied subjects (performance or composition) at universities and conservatories, it is important that MM graduates have this broader understanding of music history and theory.

== Admission requirements ==
To be admitted to a MM program, most institutions require an undergraduate degree or diploma in music, such as a BM or BA with a major in music, usually with a grade average of B+ or higher. MM programs in performance usually require a live audition that includes advanced pieces (or for singers, songs) from a wide range of styles, typically ranging from the Baroque era (1600-1750), the Classical music period (1750-1800), the Romantic music era (1800-1910) to the 20th and/or 21st century. Singers typically perform arias from operas and art songs, which are typically accompanied by a pianist. Instrumental musicians typically perform solo J. S. Bach or other unaccompanied repertoire, a movement from a sonata, and a movement from a virtuoso concerto. Instrumentalists who play orchestral instruments (violin family, woodwinds, brass, etc.) may be asked to perform excerpts from the standard orchestral repertoire. Auditionees are typically told which pieces and movements to prepare; some schools even give the bar numbers or rehearsal letters (e.g., Beethoven Symphony no. 5, movement 1, bar 100 to 120).

Some institutions use videotaped recitals or performances as a pre-screening method. This approach helps to eliminate candidates who do not meet the school's minimum performance standards, and as such, it saves those candidates the time and cost of traveling to the institution for an in-person audition, and it also saves the school the cost of having a panel of professors hear the candidate on location. Some universities have multiple audition locations to reduce the traveling expenses faced by candidates. For example, a school located on the west coast of the United States might offer the option of auditioning at a central and eastern US location. The school's professors who form the audition panel travel to these other locations to hear auditionees. Some schools which normally require in-person auditions waive this requirement for students who play the larger instruments (e.g., double bass and tuba), and allow a videotape to be sent instead.

Applicants are typically asked for official transcripts from all post-secondary programs and letters of recommendation from music professors and teachers. For most graduate programs, transcripts of every program or degree are required, whether or not the degree was completed. For students who have started out, but then withdrawn from a number of programs, they may have to request transcripts from many institutions. To protect against applicants changing marks on the transcripts using forgery, most schools require that the transcripts be sent directly from the previous institution's registrar to the music school, or that the transcripts be in sealed envelopes with the other school's registrar's seal (stamp) over the closure. Some programs may also request a statement of intent/statement of purpose or another type of essay, in which the candidate explains why she wishes to be admitted, and sets out her professional, performance or career goals. Some programs may request copies of recital programs from previous performances or a list of performance experience, which may include, for orchestral instrumentalists, orchestra experience.

In some universities, candidates must also be admitted to the university's graduate school; as such, applicants may have to achieve a certain mark on standardized tests, such as the GRE. Similarly, students from countries where the official language is not that of the university may be required to achieve a certain mark on standardized language tests. For example, students applying to a US MM program who come from a country where English is not an official language, may be required to pass the Test of English as a Foreign Language (TOEFL). Admission to MM programs in conducting often requires a video recording of a live rehearsal and performances as a pre-screening element. Composition programs usually require the submission of a portfolio of compositions, including scores and recordings (audio or video) of live performances.

== Careers ==
The MMus degree is usually undertaken to prepare students to be professional performers (typically either singers or instrumental musicians), conductors, and composers. As such many recipients of the MMus degree do not seek further formal education after they complete the MMus. The MMus is typically the minimum credential that allows them to teach instrumental or vocal performance at universities, colleges, and conservatories.

Some institutions will also hire teachers who do not have the MMus who hold an Artist's Diploma or similar diploma, and/or who have had a significant performing career as either a solo recitalist, chamber musician or orchestral musician. Some graduates do additional graduate or professional study in other areas, such as a law degree or medical degree.

The combination of an MMus and a professional degree could enable the degree holder to work in fields where music and law (or medicine) overlap. Recipients of the MMus may also make use of the general education provided in the degree (e.g., in writing and researching) to get a job in government, university administration, or in the non-profit or arts administration sector.

Other recipients of the MMus may go on to further graduate studies in music by continuing their MMus specialization in performance or conducting at the doctoral level, by completing a DMA (Doctor of Musical Arts) degree in those areas. Some students branch out to another area of music at the PhD level, such as musicology or music theory. While PhD programs in musicology and music theory normally require an MA in music, in some cases, students with a MMus in performance or composition who show strong promise may be conditionally admitted to PhD programs in musicology or music theory.

As well, some recipients of the MMus degree may go on to do graduate work in another area in which music is a supporting field, such as an EdD in music education (e.g., specializing in music instruction) or a master's degree in Library Science, in order to become a music reference librarian. MMus graduates who wish to pursue graduate studies in an area that is not directly connected with music may be conditionally admitted to PhD programs in areas such as women's studies or sociology, subject to the condition that they complete a list of qualifying courses.

== See also ==
- Bachelor of Music
- Doctor of Music
- Doctor of Musical Arts
