= Accounting outsourcing =

Form of outsourcing

Accounting outsourcing, also known as finance and accounting outsourcing, is a subset of outsourcing that involves contracting operations related to accounting and other internal financial controls to a second-party service provider. Accounting outsourcing is a type of back office outsourcing, which includes internal business functions such as human resources or finance and accounting.

== Overview ==
Accounting outsourcing can be divided into two categories; services for transaction intensive processes and services for knowledge-intensive processes.

Transaction intensive processes include:

- Accounts payable/receivable accounting
- General accounting
- Payroll accounting
- Fixed assets accounting
- Tax accounting

Knowledge-intensive processes are typically higher value, and include activities such as:

- Budgeting and forecasting
- Capital budgeting
- Internal auditing
- Management reporting and analysis
- Regulatory reporting and compliance
- Treasury and risk management
- Accounting process oversight
- Accounting process advisory

According to the Dutch CBI, the most commonly outsourced accounting processes are transaction reporting, financial reporting, month-end closing, and financial planning and analysis.

In the US in particular, a shortage of locally available talent is cited as a major reason for accounting outsourcing.Starting around 2023, the use of accounting outsourcing in US labor market increased substantially. However, many businesses also outsource accounting functions to gain access to more specialized talent, as well as other benefits of outsourcing.

The global market for finance and accounting outsourcing was estimated at US$43.1 billion in 2022, with US$19.4 billion of that coming from the United States.

=== Fractional accounting ===
Fractional accounting is a type of fractional work where individuals or teams take on partial financial and accounting roles at company. A fractional CFO, for example, might serve as a CFO at several companies simultaneously, none of which have a need for a full-time CFO.

Fractional accounting usually refers to hiring an accountant to fill an executive level position at a company, but with fewer responsibilities than a full-time employee, while outsourcing usually describes assigning specific tasks to individuals or teams outside of the company. The terms are also sometimes used interchangeably.

== Advantages ==
As with most types of business process outsourcing, one of the main advantages of accounting outsourcing is lower costs. Tasks may be outsourced to markets with lower labor costs, and fewer on-site employees lowers infrastructure costs. Professional accountants may also have access to specialized tools and software, allowing companies working with them to reduce technology costs.

Accounting outsourcing is also used to access experts with knowledge of new financial regulations. This method is used to reduce costs for training staff and educating employees about regulations.

Outsourcing accounting is also used by businesses that experience variable accounting needs. By outsourcing accounting functions, companies are able to scale up and down according to fluctuations in their need for accounting services. Small and medium enterprises in particular outsource accounting functions as the size of their business sometimes does not justify full-time accountants.

Some research suggests that outsourcing accounting functions enhances the overall revenue of businesses using the services.

== Disadvantages ==
One of the main disadvantages of outsourcing accounting is loss of control of data. Outside parties having access to data can compromise confidentiality and increases the risk of data breaches via cyber attacks, meaning that contracted accounting service can require additional vetting and legal agreements.

Communication problems are another commonly cited disadvantage. Since outside contractors may be unfamiliar with the business, it can be difficult to communicate specific business needs. When outsourcing occurs in another country, culture and language barriers can also impede communication.

Dependency is also a common concern. Overreliance on an external service provider can sometimes lead to reduced flexibility and operational freedom.

== See also ==
- Outsourcing
- Offshoring
- Nearshoring
- Homeshoring
