= Mark Goyder =

British author

Mark Goyder (born 11 June 1953) is a British author, governance expert and public speaker who is known for his work in the fields of corporate governance, corporate social responsibility, stewardship and sustainability. He is the CEO and founder of Tomorrow's Company, an independent business-led think tank which laid the foundations for the enlightened shareholder value approach in the redefinition of the directors' duties in the Companies Act 2006.

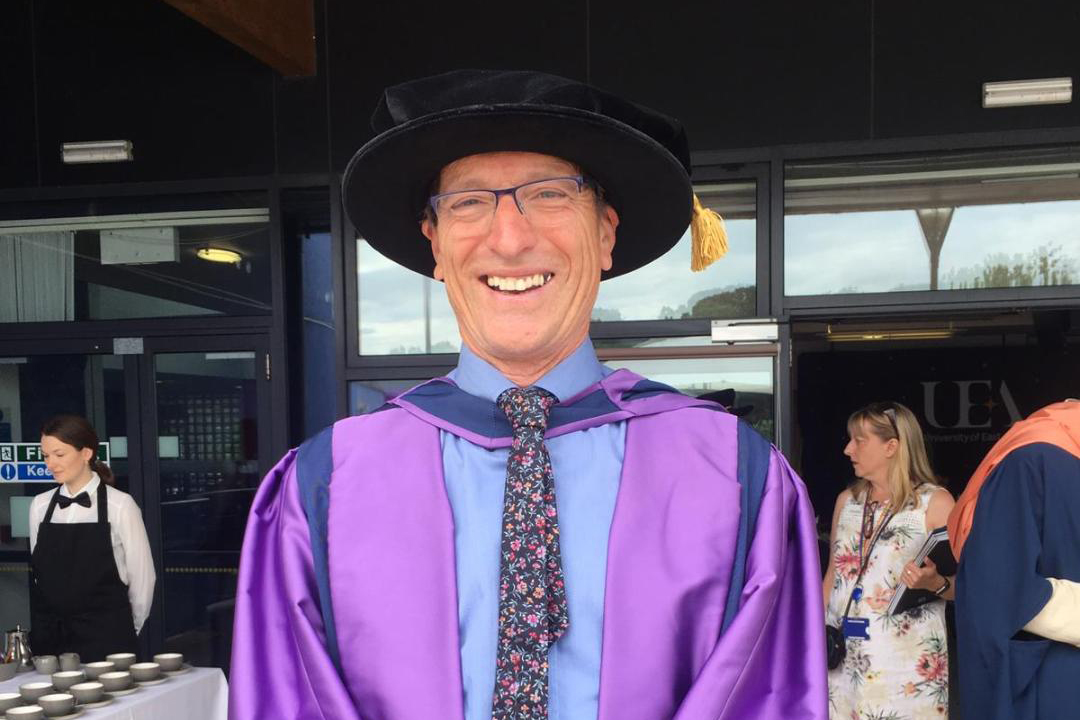
Mark Goyder receiving honorary doctorate at UEA (2019)

== Education ==
Goyder attended Trinity College, Cambridge and graduated with an MA in Economics, Social and Political Sciences. He was President of the Cambridge Union in 1973.

== Politics ==
In 1985 Goyder lived in Lynsted in 'mainland' Kent, but succeeded in being elected as an SDP-Liberal Alliance candidate to represent the eastern end of the Isle of Sheppey on Kent County Council.

== Royal Society of Arts ==
Goyder spent 15 years in the manufacturing industry and found himself wondering what really motivated people to come to work. In April 1990 he was given the opportunity to pursue this line of inquiry on a professional basis after being persuaded by Charles Handy to become a program director at the Royal Society of Arts. In 1993 he initiated a business-led inquiry into the role of business in a changing world along with 25 business leaders with the objective to develop a shared vision of the company of tomorrow. The findings were published in 1995 as the Tomorrow's Company Inquiry. The Inquiry laid the foundations for the enlightened shareholder value approach which would eventually redefine directors' duties in the 2006 Companies Act. The following year Goyder left his position at the RSA and founded Tomorrow's Company. He became the CEO, a role he has held to this day.

== Speaking and writing ==
Goyder is a public speaker who has given speeches at major international conferences in South Africa, India, Saudi Arabia, the Philippines and Singapore. His articles have appeared in numerous publications including The Guardian, The Wall Street Journal and The Financial Times. He has also appeared before several Select Committees at the House of Commons including the Select Committee on Environmental Audit. and the Select Committee on Work and Pensions.

In 2009 Goyder authored a 'Stewardship League' which ranked English Premier League clubs based on whether the boards focus on management continuity, youth development, improved facilities, and the club giving something back to the community.

== Awards ==
- Institute of Management Studies Tillers Millennium Trophy for best speaker
- Director Magazine Director of the Month in June 2004
- University of East Anglian Honorary Doctorate - Doctor of Civil Law 2019

== Books ==
He is the author of the following books:

- Tomorrow's Company (1995) – ISBN 0901469246
- Living Tomorrow's Company (1998) – ISBN 0566080206
- Living Tomorrow's Company – Rediscovering the Human Purpose of Business (2013) – ISBN 9788192816319
- Entrusted: Stewardship For Responsible Wealth Creation (2019) – ISBN 9789811207556 (With Ong Boong Wee)
