= Shamrock (automobile) =

Canadian car

The Shamrock Automobile, built by the Mimna Brothers, may be one of Canada's oldest automobiles on record and possibly one of the earliest attempts at an internal combustion engine, however there is no absolute historical record. The oldest car built in Canada is the 1867 Henry Seth Taylor Steam Buggy built in Stanstead, Quebec.

== History ==
William Mimna and his brother Charles were stonemasons who lived in the small town of Wardsville, located on the Thames River, north of Chatham, Ontario. The brothers began a quest to build their own automobile as early as 1893. William worked on the car in Wardsville, Ontario for many years on his own without much help from anyone else. In 1904 he finally finished his vehicle, and some speculation remains as to the date of record or year the vehicle should be placed in. A Wardsville resident remembers the vehicle in its early years as far back as 1893, but date of record of an automobile is generally upon successful completion.

The making of the car was originally inspired by steam locomotives, however William decided that gas-powered engines was going to rule the day in transportation so this is what he built. The car ran on one cylinder, put together from whatever parts the two brothers could find in Montreal, Hamilton, Toronto and Detroit, Michigan. Instead of a transmission the Shamrock had a system of belts and clutches helping it to run. The vehicle was named Shamrock the First, and without being aware of it the Mimna Brothers became a part of Canadian history.

== Problems and competition from Henry Ford ==
One of Canada's earliest automobiles on record and a possible first attempt at an internal combustion engine vehicle was not exactly successful however, as was stated by William himself. The vehicle was unable to climb hills with its homemade engine, so the brothers decided to replace their engine with a French one, in hopes that it would have more power and be more efficient. However, this did not help as the vehicle still would not climb hills or exceed 10 miles per hour, on level ground. In 1910, six years after completing the car, the brothers made some improvements by adding pneumatic tires and a steering wheel. By this time, however, Henry Ford was already mass-producing his own vehicle in Detroit. In 1893 Ford was promoted at the Edison Illuminating Company in Detroit to chief engineer, giving him the time and money to devote his time to the creation and mass manufacturing of the automobile.

In 1914, the brothers had a renewed interest in the automobile and built Shamrock the Second, from stock parts from other cars. This car was built exactly the same as the First but was faster. This speed was not such a positive thing however, especially with the lack of a proper braking system. William hit a cow in his hometown, and the car was thus totalled and never salvaged.

Today Shamrock the First rests at the Canadian Transportation Museum and Heritage Village, where it still runs. This museum is located in Kingsville, Ontario, just outside the Detroit-Windsor border, and is home to over 60 vehicles, covering all forms of Canadian automotive history.
