= Career =

Individual's journey through learning, work, and other aspects of life

A career is an individual's metaphorical "journey" through learning, work and other aspects of life. There are a number of ways to define career and the term is used in a variety of ways.

== Definitions ==
The Oxford English Dictionary defines "career" as a person's "course or progress through life (or a distinct portion of life)". This definition relates "career" to a range of aspects of an individual's life, learning, and work. "Career" is also frequently understood to relate to the working aspects of an individual's life - as in "career woman", for example. A third way in which the term "career" is used describes an occupation or a profession that usually involves specific training and/or formal education, considered to be a person's lifework. In this case "a career" is seen as a sequence of related jobs, usually pursued within a single industry or sector: one can speak for example of "a career in education", of "a criminal career" or of "a career in the building trade". A career has been defined by organizational behavior researchers as "an individual's work-related and other relevant experiences, both inside and outside of organizations, that form a unique pattern over the individual's life span."

Some sources refer to career stages, such as "early career", "mid-career", as in the Jim Duggins Outstanding Mid-Career Novelists' Prize, awarded to novelists who have "built a strong reputation and following, and show promise to continue publishing high quality work for years to come", and finally, a "late career" or "later career" stage.

Other writers in the fields of career development and vocational psychology also define a career differently, beyond a person's paid work. For example, this definition has attracted attention in 21st-century literature as it extends the realm of career beyond paid work and includes a range of life domains and activities as part and parcel of career development:

Career development involves one's whole life, not just occupation. As such, it concerns the whole person… More than that, it concerns him or her in the ever-changing contexts of his or her life. The environmental pressures and constraints, the bonds that tie him or her to significant others, responsibilities to children and aging parents, the total structure of one's circumstances are also factors that must be understood and reckoned with. In these terms, career development and personal development converge. Self and circumstances – evolving, changing, unfolding in mutual interaction – constitute the focus and the drama of career development.

=== Etymology ===
The word "career" ultimately derives from Latin carrus, referring to a chariot.

The Online Etymology Dictionary claims the semantic extension whereby "career" came to mean "course of one's public or professional life" appears from 1803. It is used in dozens of books published in the year 1800, in reference to Goethe's "literary career", other biographical figures' "business career" and "professional career", so the phrase likely was in regular use by the year 1800.

== Historic changes in careers ==
For a pre-modernist notion of "career", compare cursus honorum.

By the late 20th century, a wide range of variations (especially in the range of potential professions) and more widespread education had allowed it to become possible to plan (or design) a career: In this respect the careers of the career counselor and of the career advisor have grown up. It is also not uncommon for adults in the late 20th/early 21st centuries to have dual or multiple careers, either sequentially or concurrently. Thus, professional identities have become hyphenated or hybridized to reflect this shift in work ethic. Economist Richard Florida notes this trend generally and more specifically among the "creative class".

== Career management ==
Career management or career development describes the active and purposeful management of a career by an individual. Ideas of what comprise "career management skills" are described by the Blueprint model (in the United States, Canada, Australia, Scotland, and England) and the Seven C's of Digital Career Literacy (specifically relating to the Internet skills).

Key skills include the ability to reflect on one's current career, research the labour market, determine whether education is necessary, find openings, and make career changes.

=== Career choice ===
According to Behling and others, an individual's decision to join a firm may depend on any of the three factors viz. objective factor, subjective factor and critical contact.

- Objective factor theory assumes that the applicants are rational. The choice, therefore, is exercised after an objective assessment of the tangible benefits of the job. Factors may include the salary, other benefits, location, opportunities for career advancement, etc.
- Subjective factor theory suggests that decision making is dominated by social and psychological factors. The status of the job, reputation of the organization, and other similar factors plays an important role.
- Critical contact theory advances the idea that a candidate's observations while interacting with the organization plays a vital role in decision making. For example, how the recruiter keeps in touch with the candidate, the promptness of response and similar factors are important. This theory is more valid with experienced professionals.

These theories assume that candidates have a free choice of employers and careers. In reality, the scarcity of jobs and strong competition for desirable jobs severely skews the decision-making process. In many markets, employees work particular careers simply because they were forced to accept whatever work was available to them. Additionally, Ott-Holland and colleagues found that culture can have a major influence on career choice, depending on the type of culture.

When choosing a career that's best for you, according to US News, there are multiple things to consider. Some of those include: natural talents, work style, social interaction, work–life balance, whether or not you are looking to give back, whether you are comfortable in the public eye, dealing with stress or not, and finally, how much money you want to make. If choosing a career feels like too much pressure, here's another option: pick a path that feels right today by making the best decision you can, and know that you can change your mind in the future. In today's workplace, choosing a career doesn't necessarily mean you have to stick with that line of work for your entire life. Make a smart decision, and plan to re-evaluate down the line based on your long-term objectives.

=== Career (occupation) changing ===
Changing occupation is an important aspect of career and career management. Over a lifetime, both the individual and the labour market will change; it is to be expected that many people will change occupations during their lives. Data collected by the U.S. Bureau of Labor Statistics through the National Longitudinal Survey of Youth in 1979 showed that individuals between the ages of 18 and 38 will hold more than 10 jobs.

There are various reasons why people might want to change their careers. Sometimes career change can come as the result of a long-anticipated layoff, while other times it can occur unexpectedly and without warning.

A survey conducted by Right Management suggests the following reasons for career changing.

- The downsizing or the restructuring of an organization (54%).
- New challenges or opportunities that arise (30%).
- Poor or ineffective leadership (25%).
- Having a poor relationship with a manager(s) (22%).
- For the improvement of work/life balance (21%).
- Contributions are not being recognized (21%).
- For better compensation and benefits (18%),
- For better alignment with personal and organizational values (17%).
- Personal strengths and capabilities are not a good fit with an organization (16%).
- The financial instability of an organization (13%).
- An organization relocated (12%).

According to an article on Time.com, one out of three people currently employed (as of 2008) spends about an hour per day searching for another position.

== Career success ==
Career success is a term used frequently in academic and popular writing about career. It refers to the extent and ways in which an individual can be described as successful in their working life so far.

During the 1950s and 1960s, individuals typically worked for one or two firms during their career and success was defined by the organization and measured by promotions, increases in salary, and/or status. Such traditional careers were exemplified by Donald Super's career stage model. Super's linear career stage model suggested that careers take place within the context of stable, organizational structures. Individuals moved up the organization's hierarchy seeking greater extrinsic rewards.

Early career success may breed disappointment later, especially when a person's self-worth is tied up in their career or achievements. Professional success tends to come early in some fields, such as scientific research, and later in other fields, such as teaching.

Earnings can be expressed either in absolute terms (e.g. the amount a person earns) or in relative terms (e.g. the amount a person earns compared with their starting salary). Earnings and status are examples of objective criteria of success, where "objective" means that they can be factually verified, and are not purely a matter of opinion.

Many observers argue that careers are less predictable than they once were, due to the fast pace of economic and technological change. This means that career management is more obviously the responsibility of the individual rather than their employing organisation, because a "job for life" is a thing of the past. This has put more emphasis on subjective criteria of career success. These include job satisfaction, career satisfaction, work-life balance, a sense of personal achievement, and attaining work that is consistent with one's personal values. A person's assessment of their career success is likely to be influenced by social comparisons, such as how well family members, friends, or contemporaries at school or college have done.

The amount and type of career success a person achieves is affected by several forms of career capital. These include social capital (the extent and depth of personal contacts a person can draw upon), human capital (demonstrable abilities, experiences and qualifications), economic capital (money and other material resources which permit access to career-related resources), and cultural capital (having skills, attitudes or general know-how to operate effectively in a particular social context).

== Career support ==
There are a range of different educational, counseling, and human resource management interventions that can support individuals to develop and manage their careers. Career support is commonly offered while people are in education, when they are transitioning to the labour market, when they are changing career, during periods of unemployment, and during transition to retirement. Support may be offered by career professionals, other professionals or by non-professionals such as family and friends. Professional career support is sometimes known as "career guidance" as in the OECD definition of career guidance:

The activities may take place on an individual or group basis, and may be face-to-face or at a distance (including helplines and web-based services). They include career information provision (in print, ICT-based and other forms), assessment and self-assessment tools, counselling interviews, career education programmes (to help individuals develop their self-awareness, opportunity awareness, and career management skills), taster programmes (to sample options before choosing them), work search programmes, and transition services."

However this use of the term "career guidance" can be confusing as the term is also commonly used to describe the activities of career counselors.

=== Provision of career support ===
Career support is offered by a range of different mechanisms. Much career support is informal and provided through personal networks or existing relationships such as management. There is a market for private career support however the bulk of career support that exists as a professionalised activity is provided by the public sector.

=== Types of career support ===
Key types of career support include:

- Career information describes information that supports career and learning choices. An important sub-set of career information is labour market information (LMI), such as salaries of various professions, employment rate in various professions, available training programs, and current job openings.
- Career assessments are activities, instruments, tools, tests, and inventories that come in a variety of forms and rely on both quantitative and qualitative methodologies. Career assessments can help individuals identify and better articulate their unique interests, personality, values, and skills to determine how well they may match with a certain career. Some skills that career assessments could help determine are job-specific skills, transferable skills, and self-management skills. Career assessments can also provide a window of potential opportunities by helping individuals discover the tasks, experience, education and training that are needed for a career they would want to pursue. Career counselors, executive coaches, educational institutions, career development centers, and outplacement companies often administer career assessments to help individuals focus their search on careers that closely match their unique personal profile.
- Career counseling assists people with making choices and plans based on their interests, personality, values and skills, and helps them to explore career options and research preferred and optimal pathways. Career counseling provides one-on-one or group professional assistance in exploration and decision-making tasks related to a variety of goals and intentions, such as choosing a major/occupation, transitioning into the world of work, changing career directions, or further professional training.
- Career education describes a process by which individuals come to learn about themselves, their careers and the world of work. There is a strong tradition of career education in schools, however career education can also occur in a wider range of other contexts including further and higher education and the workplace. A commonly used framework for careers education is DOTS which stands for decision learning (D), opportunity awareness (O), transition learning (T), and self-awareness (S). Oftentimes, higher education is thought of as being too narrow or too researched based and lacking of a deeper understanding of the material to develop the skills necessary for a certain career.

Some research shows adding one year of schooling beyond high school creates an increase of wages 17.8% per worker. However, additional years of schooling, beyond 9 or 10 years, have little effect on worker's wages. In 2010, 90% of the U.S. Workforce had a high school diploma, 64% had some college, and 34% had at least a bachelor's degree.

The common problem that people may encounter when trying to achieve an education for a career is the cost. The career that comes with the education must pay well enough to be able to pay off the schooling. The benefits of schooling can differ greatly depending on the degree (or certification) obtained, the programs the school may offer, and the ranking of the school. Sometimes, colleges provide students more with just education to prepare for careers. It is not uncommon for colleges to provide pathways and support straight into the workforce the students may desire.

Much career support is delivered face-to-face, but an increasing amount of career support is delivered online.

== See also ==
- Job satisfaction
- Curriculum vitae
- Employment
- Profession
- Portfolio career
- Anticipatory socialization
