= Fractional work =

Work arrangement where an individual provides services to multiple organizations

Fractional work (also known as fractional employment, fractional professionals, or fractional executives) refers to a work arrangement in which an individual provides specialized skills or professional services to multiple organizations, typically on a part-time or project basis. The arrangement allows professionals to contribute their expertise without being employed full-time by a single organization. The concept has gained attention in discussions about flexible employment and changing workplace dynamics. It is sometimes linked to developments in remote work, the gig economy, and the increasing interest of organizations in accessing experienced professionals in a cost-efficient manner. However, the term lacks a universally accepted definition, and its interpretation may vary across industries and regions.

== Difference between fractional work, part-time and contractor work ==
Part-time employment or a part-time job typically involves working fewer hours than a full-time employee, usually less than 35 hours per week. Part-time employees are usually entitled to receive some of the same benefits as full-time employees, such as holiday pay, sick pay and pro-rata pension scheme. However, they may not receive all the same benefits as full-time employees and may not have the same job security.

Working as a contractor involves working on a short-term basis for a specific project or service, often as an independent contractor or freelancer. Contractors are usually paid on a project basis or hourly rate and are responsible for paying their own taxes and expenses. Contractors typically work on a project basis and have more control over their schedule and work arrangements.

Fractional work is a newer term that refers to working either part-time or full-time, but not in a traditional job with a single employer. Instead, fractional workers work for multiple clients or employers, usually remotely, and may offer specialized expertise. Fractional work can be project-based or ongoing, and may involve a higher level of autonomy and flexibility than traditional part-time employment.

== Types of fractional workers ==
Fractional executives are experienced professionals who hold executive roles (CxO), such as CEO, CFO, CMO, CIO, or COO, in multiple organizations simultaneously. They offer strategic guidance and management expertise to companies that may not require or cannot afford a full-time executive. The common factor is that these CxO professionals have held these positions before at other start-up, scale-up or corporate companies before.

Fractional professionals are experts in specific fields, such as finance, marketing, human resources, or information technology, who provide their specialized skills and services to multiple clients. They typically work on a contract or project basis and can be found across various industries.

Fractional freelancers are self-employed individuals (self-employment) who offer their skills and expertise in specific areas on a per-project basis. They usually have a diverse clientele, which may include businesses, non-profit organizations, or even individuals.

== See also ==
- Gig worker
- Remote work
- Part-time job
- Interim management
- Fractional executive
- Fractional CIO
