= Fractional executive =

Management occupation

Fractional executives are senior professionals who provide executive-level management services to organizations on a part-time or contract basis, a practice often referred to as fractional work. These individuals typically possess extensive leadership experience in positions such as chief executive officer (CEO), chief financial officer (CFO), chief information officer (CIO), chairperson, senior vice president, or director. Their expertise may be concentrated in a specific discipline, such as finance, operations, or marketing or span multiple areas of organizational management, depending on their professional background.

Fractional leadership is a distinct model that allows businesses to scale leadership resources efficiently. It can be useful in situations where companies need long-term strategic input but do not require daily, hands-on executive involvement. They differ from business consultants and part-time workers because they take an active leadership or management role in the company that hires them.

== History ==
The rise of fractional executives was particularly driven by small to mid-sized businesses, in the decades starting in the 2010s, including those under $10 million in revenue, that needed senior leadership expertise but could not justify the cost of a full-time C-suite hire. These companies benefited from access to experienced executives who worked across multiple businesses, providing strategic oversight, process improvements, and leadership at potentially reduced costs of a full-time executive.

Specific definitions and application cases have been discussed in a congress organized by the Italian HR Directors Association (AIDP) and the Italian Chief Financial Officers Association (ANDAF).

The concept has gained increasing popularity through the 2020s as startup companies tried to optimize their use of resources and bring in highly skilled leaders as needed.

One notable example of the success of the fractional executive model was A-team, a fractional executive platform launched in 2021 in response to the Great Resignation. In 2022, A-team announced that it had raised $60 million in funding from a group of investors led by Tiger Global and including Jay-Z's Marcy Venture Partners, indicating that the fractional executive model was gaining recognition as a legitimate and valuable approach to business leadership. The fractional executive model has also spread towards Europe with 10x.Team and Mateerz being notable examples.

In India, the fractional executive model has gained traction particularly in the mid-market segment, with platforms emerging to serve sectors such as manufacturing, retail, and financial services.

An emerging global community of fractional executives developed, with communities like The Fractional Executive, Fractional Connections, Lead Fractional and Fractionals United providing resources and networking opportunities for fractional executives from around the world. These communities also offered access to job listings, industry events, and educational opportunities.

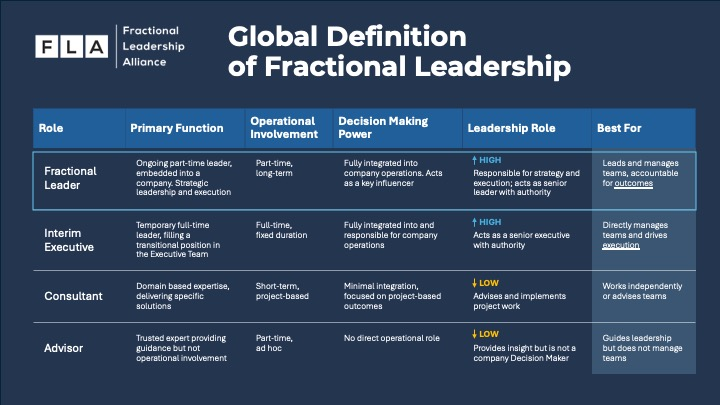

Founded in 2024, the Fractional Leadership Alliance was the first global association representing leaders of Fractional Firms, Marketplaces, Educational Organizations, Communities, and Companies who are committed to progressing the field together. The FLA operated globally and was open to all Business Owners and Investors interested in being at the ground floor of this changing work landscape. Together, they give members a shared voice to advocate for the collective interest, and elevate the industry to a higher professional standard.

The fractional executive model is expected to continue growing in popularity as companies seek to optimize their resources and bring in specialized expertise on a flexible basis. With the support of major investors and the emergence of global communities, fractional executives are set to play an increasingly important role in the business world in the years to come.

== Structure ==
Fractional executives may work as independent contractors or as part of a fractional firm. However, they differ from business consultant because they take an active leadership or management role in the company that hires them, implementing changes and leading the organization just as their permanent counterpart would. They are usually hired on a long-term basis, and usually with some type of retainer, but they do not work full-time for any particular organization. They are utilized across a diverse range of industries, including technology, healthcare, and professional services, where organizations seek executive expertise without the commitment of full-time employment.

They differ from consultants, interim executives, advisors, coaches, or other part-time workers as fractional management can be seen as a specialized evolution of interim and temporary management, but with key distinctions. While interim management traditionally focuses on high-impact, full-time leadership for a defined period—often in response to a crisis or transformation—fractional management offers part-time executive leadership on an ongoing basis. Common fractional positions include Chief Financial Officers (CFOs), who are responsible for financial strategy and governance; Chief Marketing Officers (CMOs), who oversee marketing and brand development; and Chief Technology Officers (CTOs), who direct technological initiatives and digital transformation.

The advantage of hiring such leaders is the ability to have access to highly skilled experts while removing the cost burden of a full-time headcount. They also do not attract the additional "hidden" costs of employment such as employer's tax, holiday or sick pay or employer pension contributions. The scope and duration of these engagements vary, typically involving 10 to 30 hours of work per week over a period ranging from several months to multiple years, depending on organizational requirements. The main disadvantage is that they are less committed to the business compared to a full time leader as they split their focus between different businesses.

A couple of examples of specifically named Fractional Executives are Fractional CIO, Fractional CMO, Fractional COO, Fractional CEO, Fractional Sales Manager, VP of Sales, or CSO, Fractional CFO. The model is frequently adopted by companies experiencing transitional or growth phases, such as those preparing for funding rounds, mergers and acquisitions, or expansion into new markets.
