= Spalding's Athletic Library =

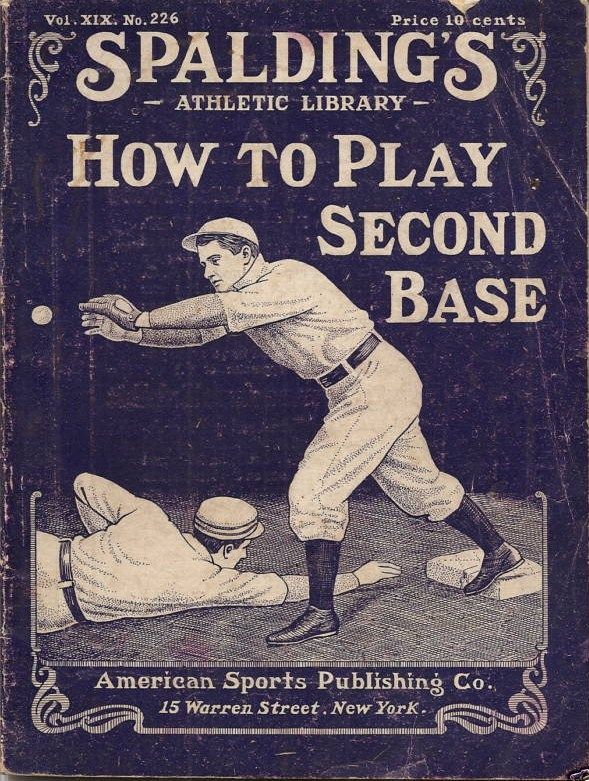
- How to Play Second Base (1905), one of the books published
- Country: United States
- Language: English
- Publisher: American Sports Publishing Company
- Published: 1892–1941

Spalding's Athletic Library were a series of sports and exercise books published through "American Sports Publishing Company" from 1892 to 1941. Both brands were owned and founded by American sporting goods manufacturer Spalding. Books covered over 30 different sports and exercises, and over 20 different organizations.

== History ==
=== Growth of Spalding Athletic Library ===
Albert Spalding created the Spalding (company) in 1876. Spalding has sold sports equipment from late 1876 to present. "Spalding Athletic Library" sold sports and exercise books through the American Sports Publishing Company from 1892 to 1941. Both companies were owned and founded by Spalding. Spalding created the Spalding Athletic Library in 1892. and founded the American Sports Publishing Company, incorporated in New Jersey in 1892. American Sports Publishing Company used a New York address from 1892 to 1941.

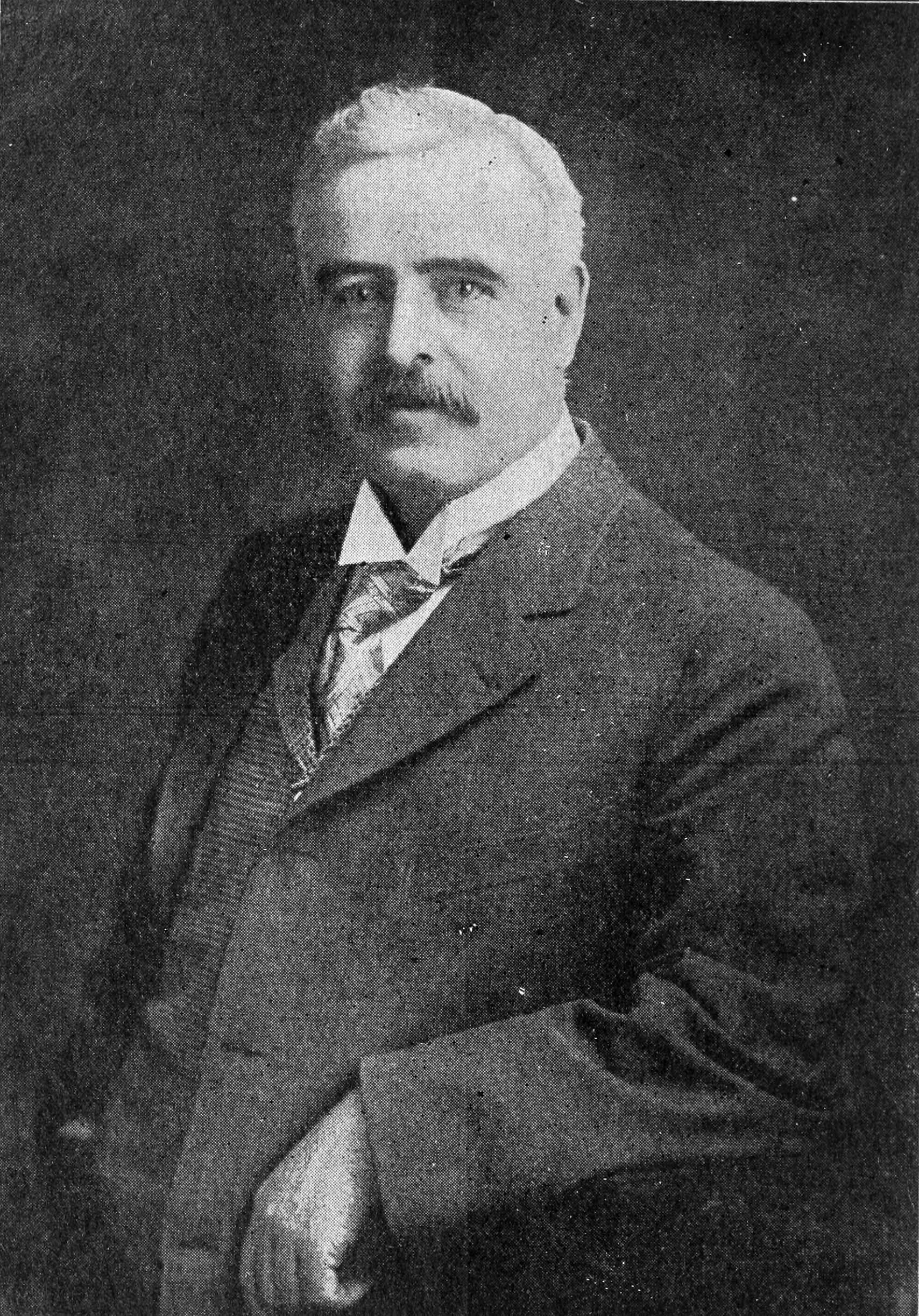
James Edward Sullivan was the first president of the American Sports Publishing Company

James Edward Sullivan was President of the American Sports Publishing Company from 1892 to 1914 which published the Spalding Athletic Library. John Doyle (vice president) was another key executive for the publishing company from 1892 to 1941.

Spalding Co purchased Wright & Ditson Co in 1892 and AJ Reach Co. in 1889. For several years after the purchases, Wright & Ditson Co and AJ Reach Co continued to publish sports books separately from the Spalding Athletic Library name. Professional baseball player George Wright co-founded Wright & Ditson Co; and professional baseball player Al Reach founded AJ Reach Co. The Spalding Baseball Guides were published under AG Spalding & Bros until 1893–1894, and starting in 1894–1895 by American Sports Publishing Company (but not using the Spalding Athletic Library name).

1941, the American Sports Publishing Company (and Spalding Athletic Library) was sold to A.S. Barnes & Co. The books now sold under A.S. Barnes & Co. name. In 1941 A.S. Barnes & Co. took over publishing the NCAA sports rules and record books from Spalding.

=== Mail order catalogue ===
Spalding produced mail order catalogues that provided a description, price and picture of their sports equipment, sports books, and exercise books. A couple of examples are How to Play Golf for 25 cents, How to Play Basketball at 10 cents, and How to Train for Bicycling at 10 cents.

=== Organizations ===
Sports and exercise books (guide books and rule books) were produced by Spalding Athletic Library for numerous organizations.

Some of the organizations included: Amateur Athletic Union (AAU), Association Football, Athletic League of the Young Men's Christian Associations of North American (YMCA), Inter-Collegiate Association of Amateur Gymnasts of America, Inter-Collegiate Athletic Association of the United States (IC4A), National Association of Professional Base Ball Leagues, National Collegiate Athletic Association (NCAA), National Indoor Baseball Association of the United States, National Roque Association of America, Olympic Games, Public Schools Athletic League, Pacific Association of the Amateur Athletic Union of the United States, Pacific Northwest Association of the Amateur Athletic Union of the United States, Public School Athletic Association of Jersey City, Public School Athletic Association of Newark, Texas Inter-Collegiate Athletic Association, United States Inter-Collegiate Lacrosse Association, and Young Men's Christian Associations of North American (YMCA).

May 1896 the Official Rowing Guide was issued. Frederick R Fortmeyer (secretary of the National Association of Amateur Oarsmen) compiled the 86-page guide. It also includes laws governing the association.

By 1898 the following leagues (associations) had already formed: The Amateur Hockey League of New York, The Amateur Hockey Association of Canada, and The Ontario Hockey Association. The 1898 Spalding Athletic Library book includes rules (laws) and results for each league (association).

July 1908, Spalding issued the official athletic rules of the Amateur Athletic Union of the United States.

In 1918 Spalding issued a book, Army and Navy Camp YMCA Physical Work to support athletic activities. In 1919 Official Athletic Almanac of the American Expeditionary Forces 1919 A.E.F. Championships Inter-Allied Games was issued.

=== First 37 books ===
The following are books published between 1892 and April 1896. Numbers 2, 3, and 4 were "issued monthly" under the Volume and Number. "Issue monthly" was later dropped from the cover. The first eighteen books were issued in between 1892 and 1894. Books nineteen to thirty six were issued between 1894 and May 1895.

Number	Name of Book	Ref
01	"Life and Battles of James J. Corbett", Volume 1, Number 1, issued in 1892. The book includes stories of Corbett's past opponents. The first book was published under: Spalding's Athletic Library, American Sports Publishing Company, New York. The editor of the first book was Richard K Fox, and Corbett is referred to as the California Wonder.	
02	"Indian Clubs and Dumb Bells", Volume 1, Number 2, issued November 1892, editor was J H Dougherty	
03	"Bowling" Volume 1, Number 3, issued December 1892, editor was A E Vogell	
04	"Boxing: a complete manual of the art of self-defense" Volume 1, Number 4, issued January 1893. Includes how to, rules, and illustrations	
05	Gymnastics by Robert Stoll	
06	Lawn Tennis by OS Campbell	
07	Base Ball by Walter Camp	
08	Golf by Stuart Balfour	
09	Athletes' Guide	
10	Croquet	
11	Official Foot Ball Guide and Referee's Book by Walter Camp	
12	Gaelic and Association Football	
13	Hand Ball	
14	Curling, Hockey and Polo	
15	Indoor Base Ball Guide	
16	Skating	
17	Basket Ball	
18	Fencing	
19	Spalding Official Baseball Guide for 1894	
20	Cricket Guide	
21	Rowing	
22	Croquet	
23	Canoeing	
24	Official Football Guide for 1894	
25	Swimming	
26	How to Play Football	
27	College Athletics	
28	Athletic Almanac	
29	Exercising with Pulley Weights	
30	How to Play Lacrosse	
31	Spalding Official Baseball Guide for 1895	
32A	Practical Ball Playing	
33	Lawn Tennis Guide for 1895	
34	Official Rowing Guide for 1895	
35	Intercollegiate AAAA Guide(IC4A)	
36	Official Golf Guide for 1895	
37	All Around athletics	

Numerous books were published until 1941.

=== Sports and exercise ===
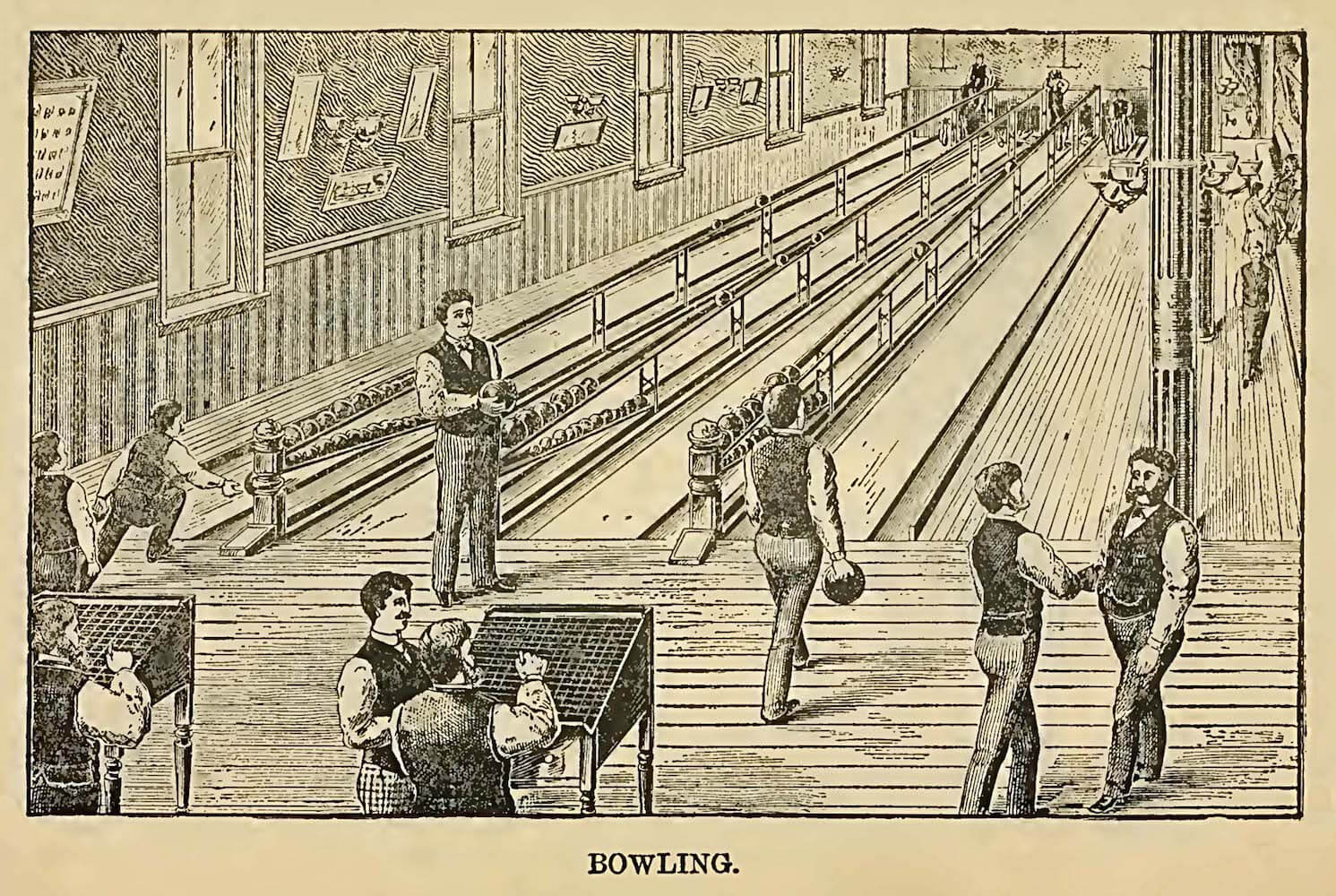
An 1892 portrayal of a bowling establishment in the Library's third volume reflects the sport's social aspect.

Spalding Athletic Library covered a variety of sports and exercises. Advertisement inside Spalding includes lists of available books which include Archery, Athletics (Track and Field; All Around; Cross country running and Marathon), Badminton, Baseball, Basketball, Bicycling, Bowling, Boxing, Canoeing, Cricket, Croquet, Curling, Fencing, (American) Football, Golf, Gymnast, Handball, Hockey, Jujutsu, Lacrosse, Lawn Sports, Polo, Pushball, Quoits, Racquetball, Rowing (sport), Rugby, Skating, Soccer (Football), Squash (sport), Swimming, Tennis, Tumbling (gymnastics), Volleyball, and Wrestling. Bodybuilding books included Dumb Bell, Indian club, Medicine Ball, and Pulley Weights.

In the self defense series, Jiu Jitsui with poses by A Minami and K Koyama.

== Sports ==
=== Baseball ===
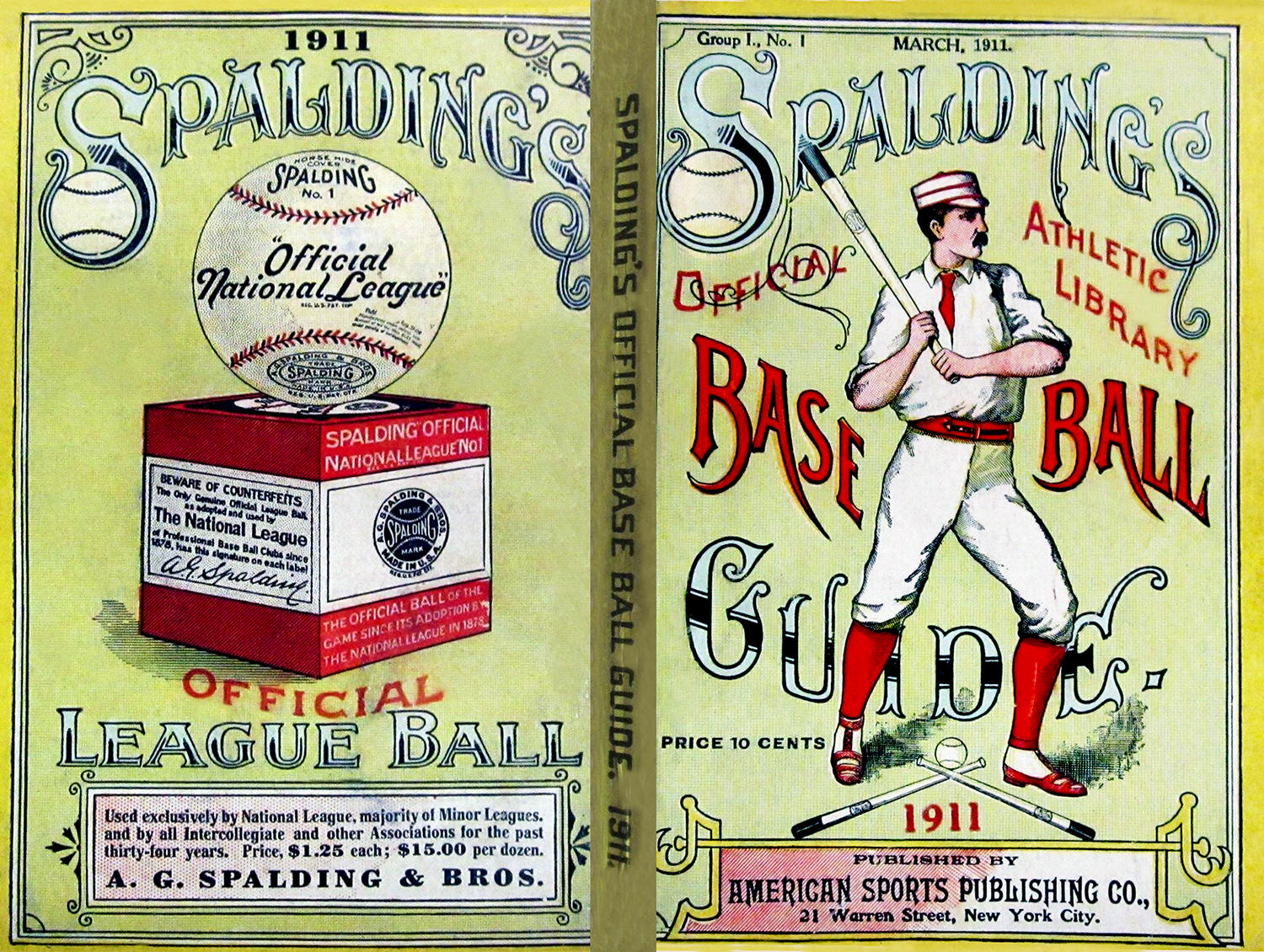
Wrap cover of Spalding's Athletic Library Baseball: Base Ball, published in 1911. The company commercialised a large variety of sports publications from the end of the 19th century to the 1910s

Spalding (Official) Baseball Guide was available 1870s to 1941. The Baseball Guide was published by A. G. Spalding & Bros. 1870s to 1893, and Spalding Athletic Library from 1894 until 1941.

Henry Chadwick, through the Spalding Athletic Library collection, added the "Technical Terms of Base Ball" in 1897.

Johnny Evers baseball hall of fame athlete added "How to Play Second Base" to the collection of the Spalding Athletic Library. Published by American Sports Publishing Company in New York, and the price on the cover was 10 cents. Copyright 1917. Topics include "Thinking Out Plays in Advance", "Advise Against Blocking", and "Important Foot-Work." The book also includes pictures and diagrams to assist with learning baseball.

In 1917 Billy Evans "noted American League Umpire" teamed up with the Spalding Athletic Library for the book, "How to umpire".

In 1922 a Spalding baseball uniform (cap, shirt, belt, pants, stockings, mitt and ball) and a Spalding book "How to Pitch" was available for $6.75 from Spalding in Newark. In 1906 the book alone sold for ten cents

Ty Cobb wrote "Strategy in the Outfield."

1919 American Sports Publishing printed a thirty-two-page magazine on baseball that included the "choosin' up" illustration by Leslie Thrasher.

=== Basketball ===
Spalding worked with Dr. James Naismith to develop the official basketball and rule book in the 1893–1894. Spalding published guides on Basketball from the 1893–1894 to 1940–1941. The guides were also used by the National Collegiate Athletic Association (NCAA) and the Amateur Athletic Union (AAU)

=== Boxing ===
1902 William Elmer and Spalding issued "Boxing". The New York Times, stated that the work provided a comprehensive look at pugilist, and prize ring history.

1913 and 1917 Spalding issued, "Boxing: a guide to the Manly Art of Self Defense. “ Includes the Science of Boxing, sparing partners, rules, hints, and many illustrations.

1914 "How to Punch a Bag" by Young Corbett was issued. Includes sample workouts, instructions, and illustrations.

1932 "A.A.U. Boxing: Official Rules, Amateur Athletic Union of the United States: Olympic Rules (international Amateur Boxing Federation Rules)” was issued.

=== American football ===
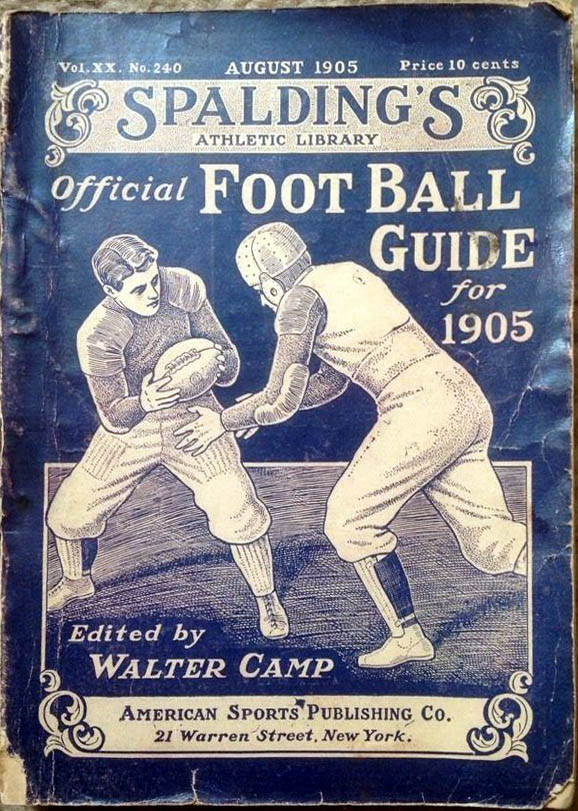
1905 Guide edited by Walter Camp

The Official Foot Ball Guide, containing official rules of the game, predated the Spalding Athletic Library, first being issued by Spalding in 1887. This annual publication actually carried forward a series of earlier football guides edited by Hall of Fame coach Walter Camp from 1884 to 1886, published by Wright and Ditson. Camp continued to edit these annual guide books in subsequent years on behalf of Spalding.

From 1887 to 1892, the printing company of Roger and Sherwood for publication. Change came in 1893 when the guides began to appear under the imprimatur of the American Sports Publishing Company, which continued the series without interruption until 1940, when the National Collegiate Athletic Association (NCAA) moved to a new publisher.

In 1896 Walter Camp's the Official Football Guide was adopted by universities such as Cornell, Harvard, Penn, Princeton, and Yale as the official rule book. The guides included an All-American football team list, football highlights, scores, and records for major universities; as well as rules with diagrams.

Beginning in 1920, Spalding began to issue regional editions of the annual Foot Ball Guide which included coverage somewhat skewed either to Eastern or Western colleges. From 1923 to 1925, this was expanded further to three distinctive versions: East, Midwest, and Pacific Coast. Identifying letters were printed on the spine to differentiate these editions at a glance. From 1926 to 1929, only one version was published, but from 1930 to 1932, a return was made to three regional editions, this time with no code letters on the spine. From 1932 until the end of the series in 1940, only one national version of the Guide was published.

For the 1941 season, the NCAA moved from Spalding to A. S. Barnes and Company of New York for its annual Official Football Guide. The NCAA took over the publisher's role itself in 1950.

The National Football League (NFL) made the college rule book its own until 1932, when the league altered a few rules for its own use and appointed its own standing Rules Committee. This shortly created a need for a parallel The National Football League: Professional Football Rules guide, which Spalding issued annually from 1935 to 1940. In these editions content specific to the NFL was appended to the basic NCAA rule book, reprinted "with permission of the NCAA Publication Committee," and fronted by a very short preface detailing "Important Rules Used Exclusively in Professional Football."

This publication was rendered obsolete in 1941 by the NFL itself with the launch of its Official National Football League Roster and Record Manual, to which a rules section was added in 1942. This publication has continued without interruption to the present day under a number of different titles, most recently the Official National Football League Record and Fact Book, with a parallel annual publication targeted to officials, players, and team executives called Official Rules for Professional Football.

=== Soccer (football) ===
Thomas Cahill (soccer, born 1864) and others assisted on creating Spalding Official Soccer (Football) Guides. The 1912 Spalding Official Soccer (Football) Guide include information on the 1912 Olympics, associations (AAFA, FIFA, American Amateur Foot Ball Association, and others), clubs, scores, records, standings, articles, and photographs. The New York Footballer's Protective Association was founded August 1912 for assisting injured athletes. In 1911 Canadian George Orton teamed up with Thomas Cahill (soccer, born 1864) for the Spalding Athletic Library Official Association Soccer (Foot Ball) Guide. In 1920 J A McWeeney (from London) was editor for How to Play Soccer. The Spalding Soccer (Football) guides were available from 1904–1905 to 1923–1924.

=== Croquet ===
Spalding issued several rules and laws books on Croquet in between 1911 and 1931, editor Charles Jacobus for the 1910 issue.

=== Golf ===
May 1895 Spalding issued Official Golf Guide, revised by L B Stoddard, which included rules, regulations, history and illustrations. Golf champions Harry Vardon and James Braid (golfer) collaborated on several editions of "How to Play Golf". Tom Bendelow was editor on many Spalding Athletic Library's official golf guides in the early years. The guides included information on championships, illustrations, and "how to". June 1901, Spalding issued the official golf guide by Charles S Cox which includes article and pictures of Harry Vardon. Grantland Rice and Bobby Jones (golfer) teamed up for Spalding's Golf Guide 1932.

=== Ice hockey ===
Spalding created guides for ice hockey starting 1897–1898 to 1941. The 1897–1898 guide was edited by JA Tuthill of the Montclair Athletic Club (ice hockey). These guides were also for the National Collegiate Athletic Association.

Arthur Farrell worked with Spalding on creating Ice Hockey Books 1901, 1905, 1906, and 1910. Frederick Toombs' Ice Hockey books were issued 1907, 1909, 1911–1914, and 1915–1918.

=== Rowing ===
May 1894 Spalding issued "Rowing" by E J Giannini. It provided a complete manual, with illustrations and valuable advice. The first section was titled, How to Use and Oar and Sculls. A similar book was issued in 1901.

In 1910 Spalding advertised book, Group XIII, No 128 "How to Row" by E J Giannini (gold medal-winning Olympian in freestyle swimming).

=== Tennis ===
Champion Bill Tilden was editor for "The Kid: A Tennis Lesson" 1921 and "Tennis: Junior, Club, Expert".

=== Olympics ===
Spalding Athletic Library sold books on the Olympics. Book, "The Olympic Games at Athens, 1906" by James Edward Sullivan, copyright 1906, and is focus on Athletics (Track and Field). The book includes information on the Games site, countries competing, dignitaries responsible for the Games (such as Theodore Roosevelt), pictures of dignitaries and athletes, dates and results of the sporting events, and Olympic Origins. The book also includes a short descriptions of "Throwing the Discus" (pages 156 through 165). The series also included "The Olympic Games Stockholm 1912" edited by James E Sullivan.

=== Athletics (track and field) ===
The 1891 Spalding's Official Athletic Guide and Handbook was published by A. G. Spalding & Bros. Spalding Athletic Library's 1893 Athletes Guide was published by American Sports Publishing Company. This guide was available until 1941.

In 1896 book No. 46 was issued, "Athletic Almanac" by J.E. Sullivan.

November 1904 The American Sports Publishing Co issued Inter-Collegiate Cross Country Association of Amateur Athletes of America: Constitution and Bylaws. The book include results, rules, and campuses in the association. The back of the book includes an abbreviated list of the Spalding Athletic Library books available early 1905.

1909 Spalding issued "Schoolyard Athletics: for youth. The book offers organization, rules, order of events, and illustrations. Editor was James E. Sullivan.

1913 George Orton teamed up with Spalding for "Athletic Training for School Boys." Book includes instructions on training, sprints, distance, hurdles and field events. Book also includes illustrations to assist the athlete.

In 1922 Spalding issued "Official Athletic Almanac" and "National Collegiate Athletic Association Track and Field Rules & Official Track and Field Guide". These books included rules, records, meet results, photographs, and past Olympic results.

Spalding issued several "how to" books, one being "How to become a weight thrower" by Olympian James Mitchel. In 1929 Olympian Archie Hahn "How to Sprint" was issued.

Spalding published the 1913 IAAF Handbook which included international athletics rules and events eligible for world records. James E. Sullivan was listed as the Chairman World's Record Committee. The organization is currently known as World Athletics
