= Anticipatory socialization =

Process in which people take on the values of groups that they aspire to join

Anticipatory socialization is the process, facilitated by social interactions, in which non-group members learn to take on the values and standards of groups that they aspire to join, so as to ease their entry into the group and help them interact competently once they have been accepted by it. It involves changing one's attitudes and behaviours in preparation for a shift in one's role. Words commonly associated with anticipatory socialization include grooming, play-acting, training, and rehearsing. Examples of anticipatory socialization include law school students learning how to behave like lawyers, older people preparing for retirement, and Mormon adolescents getting ready to become missionaries.

== History ==
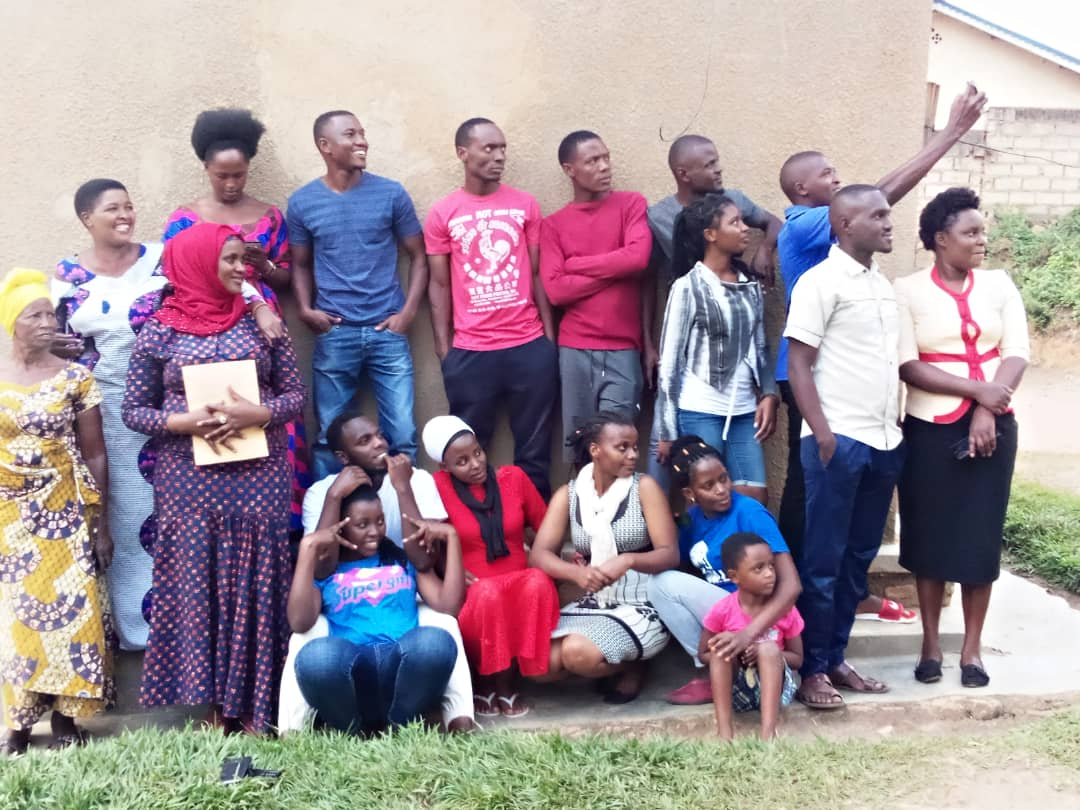
Family members influence anticipatory socialization.

The concept of anticipatory socialization, first defined by sociologist Robert K. Merton, has its origins in a 1949 study of the United States military which found that privates who modelled their attitudes and behaviours on those of officers were more likely to be promoted than those who didn't.

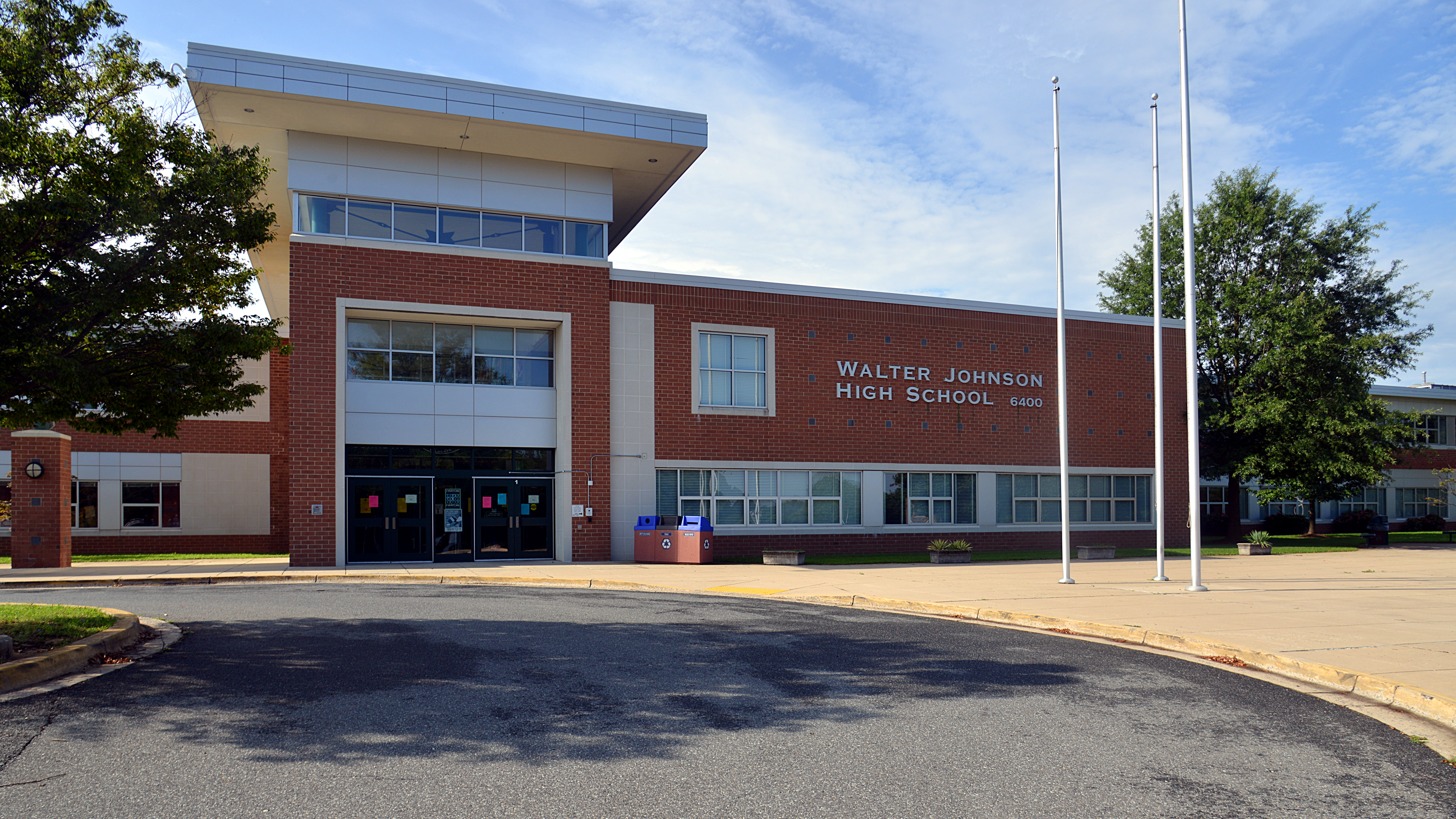
Anticipatory socialization occurs in schools.

== Types ==
According to Jablin (2001), there are two types of anticipatory socialization: vocational anticipatory socialization (VAS) and organizational anticipatory socialization (OAS). VAS involves socializing individuals to pursue particular occupations. Sources of VAS include family members, educational institutions, part-time jobs, peers and friends, and the media. With OAS, trained individuals develop expectations about their prospective careers.

== Applications ==
Gan (2021) found that positive and negative socialization experiences inspired a group of registered nurses and nursing students to become nurses. Nursing school clinicals provide students with "real job" and anticipatory socialization experiences. Clinical placements socialize students to the profession of nursing and shape students' expectations about their future roles as nurses.

When people are blocked from access to a group they might have wanted to join, they reject that group's values and norms, and instead begin the anticipatory socialization process with groups that are more receptive to them. People doing this, for example economically disadvantaged teenagers who aspire to become drug dealers rather than professionals, are sometimes criticized as lacking motivation; however, sociologists say they are simply making a pragmatic adjustment to the opportunities available to them.

Recent studies show that anticipatory socialization is prevalent among pregnant mothers who choose to reveal the fetal sex pre-birth. Knowing the gender of the baby will affect the way in with the mother interacts with the baby, as a result of preconceived expectations of gender group norms.
