= Charles Handy =

Irish economist (1932–2024)

Charles Handy CBE
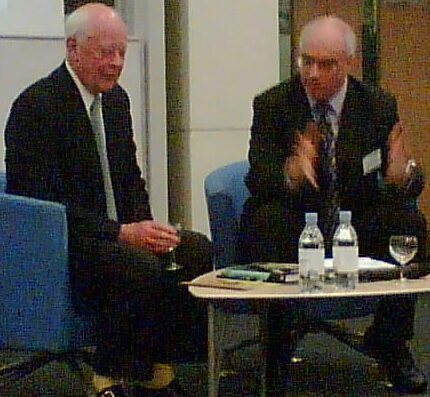
- Handy (left) in 2007
- Born: Charles Brian Handy; 25 July 1932; Clane, County Kildare, Ireland
- Died: 13 December 2024 (aged 92); London, England
- Years active: 1956–2024
- Spouse: Elizabeth Hill (died 2018)
- Children: 2

Charles Brian Handy, CBE (25 July 1932 – 13 December 2024) was an Irish author and philosopher who specialised in organisational behaviour and management. Among the ideas he advanced are the "portfolio career" and the "shamrock organization" (in which professional core workers, freelance workers and part-time/temporary routine workers each form one leaf of the "shamrock").

Handy was rated among The Thinkers 50, a private list of the most influential living management thinkers. In 2001, he was second on this list, behind Peter Drucker, and in 2005, he was tenth. When the Harvard Business Review had a special issue to mark the publication's 50th anniversary, Handy, Peter Drucker and Henry Mintzberg were asked to write special articles.

In July 2006, Handy was conferred with an honorary Doctor of Law by Trinity College Dublin.

== Background ==
Born the son of a Church of Ireland archdeacon in Clane, County Kildare, Ireland, Handy was educated as a boarder at Bromsgrove School and Oriel College, Oxford.

== Career ==
Handy's business career started in marketing at Shell plc. He left Shell to teach at the London Business School in 1972 and spent a year in Boston observing the Massachusetts Institute of Technology's way of teaching business.

He was:

- Marketing executive at Shell International Petroleum Company, from 1956 to 1965.
- Economist at Charter International, from 1965 to 1966.
- International Faculty Fellow at MIT, from 1966 to 1967.
- London Business School, from 1967 to 1995 (professor from 1978 to 1994).
- Warden at St George's House, Windsor Castle from 1977 to 1981.
- Writer and broadcaster from 1981 to 2024; his death.

Handy was the chairman of the Royal Society of Arts from 1987 to 1989 and was instrumental in persuading Mark Goyder to join which led to the Tomorrow's Company inquiry.

Handy had honorary doctorates from Bristol Polytechnic (now the University of the West of England), UEA, Essex, Durham, Queen's University Belfast and the University of Dublin. He was an honorary fellow of St Mary's College, Twickenham, the Institute of Education City and Guilds and Oriel College, Oxford. He was appointed a Commander of the Order of the British Empire (CBE) in the 2000 New Year Honours "for services to Personnel Management Education and Practice."

At the time of his death, Handy had one book forthcoming, The View from Ninety: Reflections on Living a Long, Contented Life, which is set for publication on 16 September 2025.

== Ideas and style ==
A feel for Handy's style can be gained from the opening of his autobiography: "Some years ago I was helping my wife arrange an exhibit of her photographs of Indian tea gardens when I was approached by a man who had been looking at the pictures. 'I hear that Charles Handy is here,' he said. 'Indeed he is,' I replied, 'and I am he.' He looked at me rather dubiously for a moment, and then said, 'Are you sure?' It was, I told him, a good question because over time there had been many versions of Charles Handy, not all of which I was particularly proud."

== Personal life and death ==
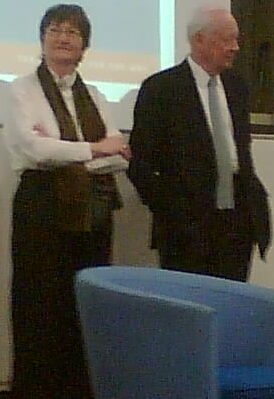
Handy (right) with his wife Elizabeth (left) in 2007

He was married to Elizabeth Handy (née Hill), a photographer, with whom he collaborated on a number of books, including The New Alchemists and A Journey through Tea. Elizabeth died in a car accident in England on 5 March 2018, at the age of 77. They had two children.

Handy died at his home in London on 13 December 2024, at the age of 92.

== Books ==
Handy was the author of the following books:

- Understanding Organisations (1976) – ISBN 0-14-015603-8.
- Gods of Management (1978) – ISBN 0-09-954841-0.
- The Future of Work (1984)
- Understanding Schools (1986)
- Understanding Voluntary Organisations (1988) ISBN 978-0-14-022491-7.
- The Age of Unreason (1989) – ISBN 0-09-954831-3.
- Inside Organisations (1990)
- The Empty Raincoat (1994) – ISBN 0-09-930125-3. US printing under title The Age of Paradox (1994) – ISBN 0-87584-425-1.
- Waiting for the Mountain to Move (1995)
- Beyond Certainty (1995) – ISBN 0-87584-763-3.
- The Hungry Spirit (1997) – ISBN 0-09-922772-X.
- New Alchemists (1999) – ISBN 0-09-179995-3.
- Thoughts for the Day (1999) – ISBN 0-09-940529-6. – (first published in 1991 as Waiting for the Mountain to Move)
- The Elephant and the Flea (2001) – ISBN 0-09-941565-8.
- A Journey through Tea – with Elizabeth Handy
- Re-invented lives (2002)
- Myself and Other More Important Matters (2006) – an autobiography and further reflections on life – ISBN 0-434-01346-3.
- The New Philanthropists (2006)
- 21 Ideas for Managers (2000) ISBN 0-7879-5219-2.
- The Second Curve (2015) ISBN 1-8479-4133-8.
