= Career management =

Career planning and development

Career management is the combination of structured planning and the active management choice of one's own professional career. Career management is also defined as the use of adaptive or planned strategies to align with an individual's personal career interests or orientation, as well as the application of successive tactics to maintain and advance that career.

Andrew Grove defined career management as:

Your career is literally your business. You own it as a sole proprietor. You have one employee: yourself. You are in competition with millions of similar businesses: millions of other employees all over the world. You need to accept ownership of your career, your skills and the timing of your moves. It is your responsibility to protect this personal business of yours from harm and to position it to benefit from the changes in the environment. Nobody else can do that for you.

== Approach ==
Career strategy pertains to the individual's general approach to the realization of career goals, and to the specificity of the goals themselves, and generally they can either be adaptive or planned. Career tactics are actions to maintain oneself in a satisfactory employment situation. Tactics may be more or less assertive, with assertiveness in the work situation referring to actions taken to advance one's career interests or to achieve one's internal needs while maintaining respect for others and adhering to organizational objectives.

Career success is defined as the effective management of one's career, demonstrated by achieving desired positions and attaining associated rewards (Valentich & Gripton 1978). The outcome of successful career management should include personal fulfillment, work–life balance, goal achievement, discipline, consistency, commitment, focus and financial security.

A career includes all types of employment ranging from semi-skilled through to skilled, and semi-professional to professional. Careers have often been restricted to an employment commitment to a single trade skill, profession or business firm for the entire working life of a person. In recent years, however, a career now includes changes or modifications in employment during the foreseeable future.

The following classification system with minor variations is widely used:

1. Development of overall goals and objectives,
2. Development of a strategy (a general means to accomplish the selected goals/objectives),
3. Development of the specific means (policies, rules, procedures and activities) to implement the strategy, and
4. Systematic evaluation of the progress toward the achievement of the selected goals/objectives to modify the strategy, if necessary.

== Goals and development ==
The career management process begins with setting goals/objectives. A relatively specific goal/objective must be formulated. This task may be quite difficult when the individual lacks knowledge of career opportunities and/or is not fully aware of their talents and abilities. However, the entire career management process is based on the establishment of defined goals/objectives whether specific or general in nature. Utilizing career assessments may be a critical step in identifying opportunities and career paths that most resonate with someone. Career assessments can range from quick and informal to more in-depth. Regardless of the ones you use, you will need to evaluate them. Most assessments found today for free (although good) do not offer an in-depth evaluation.

The time horizon for the achievement of the selected goals or objectives - short term, medium-term or long term - will have a major influence on their formulation.

1. Short-term goals (one or two years) are usually specific and limited in scope. Short-term goals are easier to formulate. Make sure they are achievable and relate to your longer term career goals.
2. Intermediate goals (3 to 20 years) tend to be less specific and more open ended than short-term goals. Both intermediate and long-term goals are more difficult to formulate than short-term goals because there are so many unknowns about the future.
3. Long-term goals (Over 20 years), of course, are the most fluid of all. Lack of life experience and knowledge about potential opportunities and pitfalls make the formulation of long-term goals/objectives very difficult. Long-range goals/objectives, however, may be easily modified as additional information is received without a great loss of career efforts because of experience/knowledge transfer from one career to another.
4. Making career choices and decisions – the traditional focus of career interventions. The changed nature of work means that individuals may have to revisit this process more frequently now than in the past.
5. Managing the organizational career – concerns the career management tasks of individuals within the workplace, such as decision-making, life-stage transitions, dealing with stress etc.
6. Managing 'boundaryless' careers – refers to skills needed by workers whose employment is beyond the boundaries of a single organization, a workstyle common among, for example, artists and designers.
7. Taking control of one's personal development – as employers take less responsibility, employees need to take control of their own development in order to maintain and enhance their employability.

== Career planning ==
Career planning is a subset of career management. Career planning applies the concepts of Strategic planning and Marketing to taking charge of one's professional future. Career is an ongoing process and so it needs to be assessed on continuous basis (Ibarra 2003). This process of re-assessing individual learning and development over a period of time is called Career Planning. According to Mondy and Noe - " Career planning is an ongoing process whereby an individual sets career goals and identifies the means to achieve them."

=== Process ===
Career planning is the continuous process of:

- thinking about your interests, values, skills and preferences;
- exploring the life, work and learning options available to you;
- ensuring that your work fits with your personal circumstances; and
- continuously fine-tuning your work and learning plans to help you manage the changes in your life and the world of work.

== See also ==
- Career
- Career change
- Career development
- Job interview
- Résumé
