= St. Louis Shamrocks =

St. Louis Shamrocks was an American soccer team based in St. Louis, Missouri. They competed in the St. Louis Association Foot Ball League, winning two championships.

Thomas Cahill founded Shamrocks in 1897. When St. Teresa was suspended from the league in 1897 for violent play, several players moved to Shamrock. They won the 1897–98 and 1898-99 St. Louis Association Football League. They finished fourth in the 1907-08 season.

== See also ... ==
- Stix, Baer and Fuller F.C. - traded as St. Louis Shamrocks from 1935 to 1938
