= Shamrock organization =

Symbolic representation of an organization with three types of workforce

The shamrock leaf shape is a symbolic representation of an organization with three types of workforce, having a main body and connected lobes that together form a whole.

The term was invented by Irish academic and management author/philosopher Charles Handy. He believed that people were the most important resource within any organisation, unlike F.W. Taylor who believed in tall hierarchical structures where workers were closely supervised. Handy believed in meeting the needs of workers through job enrichment. He did not believe in jobs for life but contracts or short-term jobs were more appropriate. He suggested that non-essential work should be contracted to specialist people who could work more productively and efficiently. In his book The Age of Unreason he uses the shamrock design to demonstrate three types of people linked to the organisation with different expectations and managed and rewarded differently. This style is known as "The Shamrock Flourish".

Shamrock organizations have an organizational structure with three distinct parts. The first part, or leaf, represents the core staff of the organization. They are likely to be highly trained professionals who form the senior management. The second leaf consists of the contractual fringe and may include individuals who once worked for the organization but now supply services to it. These individuals operate within broad guidelines set down by the organization but have a high degree of flexibility and discretionary powers. The third leaf describes the consultancy (professional/high-tech). These workers are sufficiently close enough to the organization to feel a degree of commitment to it, ensuring they maintain a high standard of work.

Handy defines the shamrock organisation as a 'core of essential executives and workers supported by outside contractors and part-time help'. This structure permits the buying-in of services as needed, with consequent reductions in overhead costs.

- The first leaf of the shamrock is the professional core. It consists of professionals, technicians and managers whose skills define the organisation's core competence. This core group defines what the company does and what business it is in. They are essential to the continuity and growth of the organisation. Their pay is tied to organisational performance and their relations will be more like those among the partners in a professional firm than those among superiors and subordinates in today's large corporation.
- The next leaf is made up of self-employed professionals or technicians or smaller specialised organisations who are hired on contract, on a project-by-project basis. They are paid in fees for results rather than in salary for time. They frequently are remote workers. No benefits are paid by the core organisation, and the worker carries the risk of insecurity.
- The third leaf comprises the contingent work force, whose employment derives from the external demand for the organisation's products. There is no career track for these people and they perform routine jobs. They are usually temporary and part-time workers who will experience short periods of employment and long periods of unemployment. They are paid by the hour or day or week for the time they work.
- A fourth leaf of the shamrock may exist, consisting of consumers who do the work of the organisation. Examples are shoppers who bag their own groceries and purchasers of assemble-it-yourself furniture.
- Outsourcing. Many companies, without going as far as the shamrock model, have made significant use of outsourcing for a range of services. Outsourcing can be used for peripheral activities such as catering and, less commonly, for mission-critical ones such as IT services. Successful outsourcing depends on three things:
  - (a) The ability to specify with precision what is to be supplied
  - (b) The ability to measure what is actually supplied and thus establish the degree of conformance with specification
  - (c) The ability to make adjustments elsewhere if specification is not achieved.
