= St. Louis Association Foot Ball League =

The Association Foot Ball League was a soccer league based in St. Louis, Missouri, that existed from 1890 until 1910.

== History ==
In 1889, several St. Louis teams banded together to form a citywide league formed under the name of the St. Louis Foot-Ball Association. The Kensingtons were the surprise winners of the first two league titles. Most of the Kensington players were local high school players, but the brilliant play of goalkeeper Jumbo Trimble led the team to victory. In 1892, Blue Bells, composed mostly of Scottish railroad workers emerged as the team to beat. In 1893, the Sodality League emerged as a rival league. Composed of teams formed from local Roman Catholic Sodalities, this league included the first St. Teresa club. In 1894 and 1895, the champions from both leagues played for the city title. St. Teresa won both years. In 1895, the Sodality League merged with the Association Foot Ball League, bringing in St. Teresa which promptly won the league title. In 1897, violent play on the part of St. Teresa led to a one-year suspension from the league. In 1907, the St. Louis Soccer League was established as a rival to the AFBL. In 1908, the best players in the AFBL moved to the SLSL, but the AFBL continued to operate as a lower level, amateur league until 1910.

== Champions ==
| Season | Winner |
|---|---|
| 1890–91 | Kensingtons |
| 1891–92 | Kensingtons |
| 1892–93 | Blue Bells |
| 1893–94 | St. Lawrence O'Toole |
| 1894–95 | Diels |
| 1895–96 | St. Teresa |
| 1896–97 | Cycling Club |
| 1897–98 | St. Louis Shamrocks |
| 1898–99 | St. Louis Shamrocks |
| 1899–1900 | West Ends |
| 1900–01 | West Ends |
| 1901–02 | West Ends |
| 1902–03 | Women's Magazine |
| 1903–04 | All-Stars |
| 1904–05 | All-Stars |
| 1905–06 | St. Leo's |
| 1906–07 | St. Leo's |
| 1907–08 | St. Leo's |
| 1908–09 | New Tariffs |
| 1909–10 | Keen Kutters |
