= Brooklyn Airport =

Public use airport in Brooklyn, Michigan

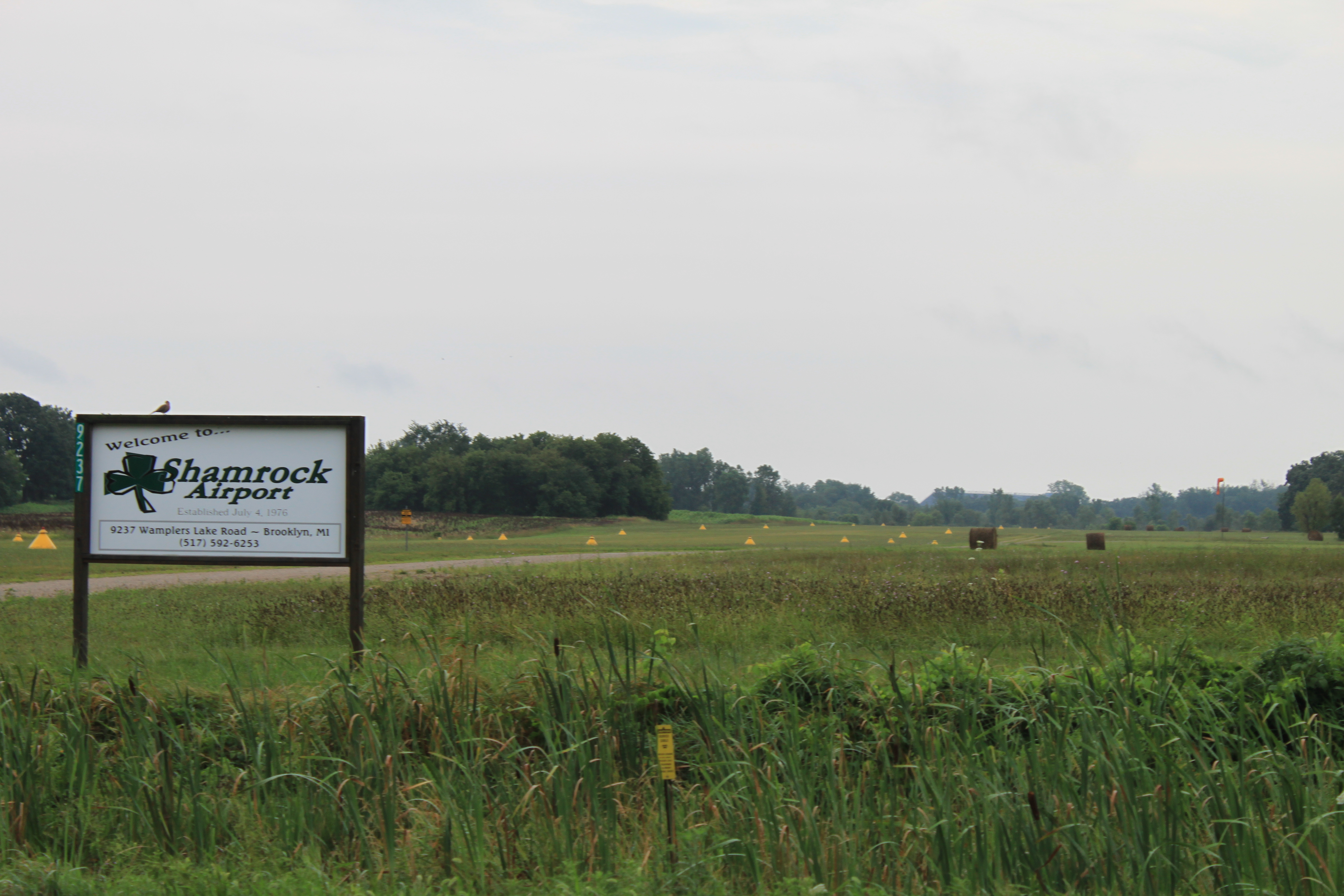
- Airport entrance viewed from Wamplers Lake Road
- IATA: none; ICAO: none; FAA LID: 6G8

Summary
- Airport type: Public
- Owner/Operator: Craig Pearson
- Serves: Brooklyn, Michigan
- Time zone: UTC−05:00 (-5)
  - Summer (DST): UTC−04:00 (-4)
- Elevation AMSL: 987 ft (301 m)
- Coordinates: 42°05′41″N 84°14′27″W
- Interactive map of Brooklyn Airport

Runways
Direction	Length		Surface
Direction	ft	m	Surface
01/19	2,822	860	Turf

Statistics (2021)
- Aircraft Movements: 552
- Based Aircraft: 1
- Source: Federal Aviation Administration

Brooklyn Airport (FAA LID: 6G8), also known as Shamrock Field, is a privately owned, public-use airport located in Brooklyn, Michigan, United States. It sits at an elevation of 987 feet.

The airfield opened in December 1975, although the sign at the entrance of the airport says it was established on the bicentennial date of July 4, 1976.

== Facilities and aircraft ==
The airport has one runway, designated as Runway 1/19. It measures 2822 x 100 ft (860 x 30 m) and is made of turf.

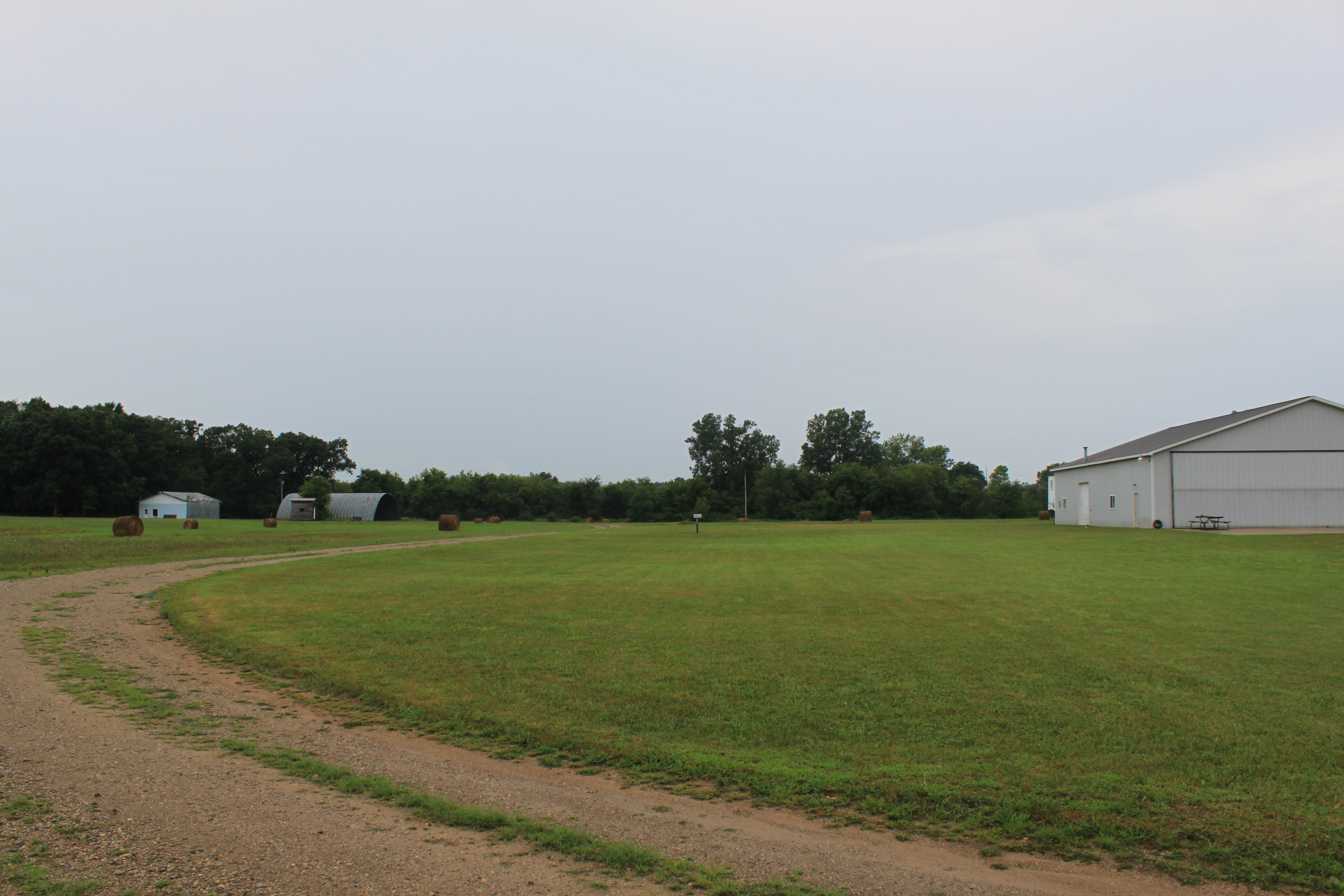
Hangar area

For the 12-month period ending December 31, 2021, the airport had 552 aircraft operations, an average of 46 per month. It was entirely general aviation. For the same time period, one aircraft is based at the airport, a single-engine airplane.

Airport facilities include parking hangars and tiedowns. There is no fixed base operator at the airport.

== Accidents and incidents ==
- On September 27, 1997, a Luscombe 8A was destroyed when it impacted powerlines while approaching Shamrock Field. The probable cause of the accident was found to be the pilot's failure to see and avoid the wires.
- On July 26, 1998, a Cessna 172M Skyhawk received substantial damage following in-flight collisions with a power line and terrain during climb out from Shamrock Field. A witness reported seeing a Cessna 172 approach to land at Shamrock Field. The aircraft touched down about midfield but was too fast. The witness further stated that at approximately 600 ft from the runway end, the pilot attempted a go-around. The witness then saw the flaps being retracted when the aircraft passed over the road and went on to say that the aircraft appeared to struggle while trying to get over the high tension power lines, but it went between the top ground wire and the next wire down. The aircraft was banking to the right and caught the right wing tip on the second wire. The aircraft rolled upside down and crashed. The probable cause was found to be the pilot's failure to attain the proper touchdown or maintain a proper lookout.
- On June 24, 2001, a Piper PA-28 was substantially damaged when the pilot landed long and the airplane overran the end of the runway at Shamrock Field. According to the pilot's written statement, he had initially mistaken the taxiway, located to the left side of the runway, for runway 01 and only identified the correct runway while on final approach. The pilot reported that once he had identified runway 01, he executed a steep approach to the runway, touching down with approximately one half of the usable runway remaining. The pilot was unable to stop the airplane prior to the end of the runway, and the airplane impacted a ditch off to the right side of the end of the runway. The probable cause of the accident was found to be that the proper touchdown point was exceeded, all of the available runway was not used, and aircraft control was not maintained by the pilot during the landing.
- On July 29, 2003, a Cessna 152 was destroyed on impact with a tree and terrain and post impact fire following an aborted landing at Shamrock Field. The pilot reported that the airplane bounced and veered to the left after touchdown. The pilot stated that he thought he had blown the left tire and tried to correct by increasing the throttle and raising one notch of flaps. The pilot indicated that he did not have enough airspeed and the left wingtip hit a tree. The airplane impacted a marsh and caught on fire. The probable cause was found to be the pilot's failure to attain the proper touchdown point as well as his general failure to maintain control of the airplane.

== See also ==
- List of airports in Michigan
