= Shamrock Field =

Sports venue in St. John's, Newfoundland

Coordinates: 47.567°N 52.716°W

Shamrock Field was a Gaelic Athletic Association ground in St. John's, Newfoundland and Labrador, Canada. Originally dating from 1838, it had a capacity of approximately 4,000. During World War II, the sports ground was used as a training camp and billet for members of the Newfoundland Militia. It was also sometimes used as the 'national stadium' of Canada GAA.

In the early 21st century, it was proposed to demolish Shamrock Field to make way for a Sobeys food retail outlet. While there were initial objections from some local residents, a supermarket was ultimately developed on the site.

== See also ==
- List of Gaelic Athletic Association stadiums
