= Interim management =

Temporary business management resources

Interim management is the temporary appointment of an experienced executive to a senior leadership role within an organisation for a defined period, typically to address situations such as organisational transition, crisis, or strategic change. In this situation, a permanent role may be unnecessary or impossible to find on short notice. Additionally, there may be nobody internally who is suitable for, or available to take up, the position in question.

== History ==
Historical antecedents come from ancient Roman times, with ancient Roman publicans (Latin: publicanus, plural: publicani) or "Roman contractors" being engaged to erect or maintain public buildings, supply armies overseas, or collect certain taxes (such as tithes and customs). This system for letting contracts was well established by the 3rd century BC.

The modern practice of interim management started in the mid to late-1970s, when permanent employees in The Netherlands were protected by long notice periods and companies faced large costs for terminating employees. Hiring temporary managers seemed like an ideal solution.

Interim Management was introduced for the first time in Europe by the Dutch consulting firm Boer and Croon, as an operational completion and implementation of the recommendations contained in the strategy projects managed by the firm. Facing extreme rigidity in hiring and firing managers and the need for extreme flexibility and speed, the solution of being able to dispose top management skills on short notice and for limited periods of time seemed to be the ideal one.

As a consequence of the success of this service in the Netherlands, Boer and Croon signed, in February 1987, a Joint Venture with the Executive Search firm Egon Zehnder International and with the Private Equity fund Euroventures, to start a new business initiative "EIM - Executive Interim Management" which its scope was to spread the Interim Management service around the world thanks to the network international of Egon Zehnder offices.

Since the 1980s, the concept and use of interim managers as a resourcing tool for organisations has received attention from academic researchers and policy makers as well as practitioners. In 1984, Atkinson postulated the emergence of an organisation design comprising both a core and a peripheral workforce, using differing forms of contractual relationship (flexibility) on an international basis. Examples of further study include Kalleberg (2000), looking at temporary, contract and part-time work; and Bosch (2004) looking at Western European "employment" relationships.

A good example of interim management benefitting from a geo-political change was its use by the German privatization agency after reunification of East and West, post 1989. The demand was created for interim managers in Eastern Germany to apply the required management and leadership competencies necessary to re-structure the formerly state owned companies. Demand continued to grow in the 1990s in Germany as the economy struggled to deal with unification, recession and resultant ambitious economic forecasts for the 'new' economy. One prominent example, mentioned by Bruns (2006) was the appointment of Helmut Sihler as interim CEO of German Telekom AG in 2001.

== Value proposition ==
There are several factors that make the interim management offering increasingly popular and cost-effective to client organisations. These factors are characterised as a 'value proposition' that interim managers offer to their clients.

Although there is some variation at the margins of interim management (with temporary workers, freelancers, contractors and consultants) the following factors are typical of the interim management value proposition:.

1. Interim managers can be in place within days as opposed to weeks or months, which is essential when time constraints are paramount. Being practiced in engaging promptly with the situation, they become effective quickly upon joining a client organisation. Because of their experience and expertise, interim managers also conduct and complete assignments effectively and with due speed.
2. Interim managers typically operate at a senior level in the client organisation, often being sensibly over-qualified for the roles they take on. They often bring skills and knowledge not otherwise in place, to address a specific skills gap or problem. Their experience and expertise enables them to be productive and make a noticeable impact from the outset, maximising the likelihood of success.
3. Unencumbered by company politics or culture, interim managers provide a fresh perspective and are able to concentrate on what is best for the business. Being independent operators, they are able to contribute honestly without constituting a threat to the incumbent management team. Not being part of a larger business they are not pressured to unnecessarily extend their assignment.
4. Rather than taking on a purely advisory role, interim managers are managers responsible for managing a particular business or project. They are accountable for results.
5. Operating at or near board-level gives interim managers the authority and credibility to effect significant change or transition within a company. Unlike a 'temp', they are not just there to 'hold the fort'. They actively add value to the client organisation as a result of their expertise and approach, even when the work and the decisions to be made are difficult.
6. Organisations often engage interim managers for their ability to provide experienced leadership on a temporary basis, particularly in situations requiring rapid deployment, specialised expertise, or independent oversight during periods of change. Interim managers are paid on the understanding of goals and objectives being performed and delivered, and not simply on the basis of attendance.
7. Interim managers maintain high professional standards because their future work relies upon referrals and a successful track record. They therefore have a stake in the success of the assignments that they undertake. This contrasts favourably with other 'temporary workers' who may also be seeking 'permanent employment' or simply motivated by a day rate or extending their tenure.
8. Interim managers are available to work on a fractional or part-time basis. Especially in smaller organizations their skills may only be required for one or two days per week. The fractional executive saves companies money as they only pay for what they need.

== Assignment lifecycle ==
Interim assignments vary in scope and requirements, encompassing change management, 'gap' assignments, project management and turnaround management. The following stages of the 'assignment lifecycle' are typical of how interim managers enter into an assignment, reach and carry out the actual implementation, and finally exit the assignment. The assignment should include a plan for making resources available to meet the longer-term goals.

The early stages have much in common with consultancy, as do later stages with project management, but the accountability and responsibility that interim managers have for successful analysis and delivery of a fitting solution, is what makes these stages uniquely typical of the interim management approach.

1. Entry. The prospective client and Interim make initial contact and explore the requirement sufficiently for the client to be able to decide to engage the interim manager (or not) to address the situation. This is likely to involve a 'preliminary' assessment of what the client thinks they want and the scope of the interim manager's contribution. It is also likely to involve a due diligence and interview process to make sure the interim manager is the right fit for the business. Typically the entry stage takes place over one or more initial meetings and results in the interim manager's provisional engagement.
2. Diagnosis. The interim manager researches the current situation in order to understand it, how it came about, what are the requirements of the varying stakeholders. At this stage a more detailed understanding of 'what the situation is' is formed as well as approaches to address it. Differing issues or problems may come to light at this stage than initially highlighted by the client. On a 'gap' assignment this diagnosis may run concurrently with the handling of immediate issues. Typically the diagnosis stage takes a few days.
3. Proposal. The interim manager presents a more detailed proposal that serves as an interim assignment objectives and plan. If this differs significantly from the preliminary plans determined at 'entry', the solution may involve different requirements from the interim manager or possibly the ending of the assignment. It is common that this 'proposal' may challenge the client's understanding of the situation, on the basis of the interim manager's expertise. The interim manager takes the responsibility to propose a solution most likely to be effective, not automatically the one originally requested. In the case of a 'gap assignment' such a proposal may simply outline how the interim manager is a 'safe pair of hands'.
4. Implementation. The interim manager manages the intervention, project, or solution, tracking progress and conducts periodic feedback reviews with the client. During this stage, interim managers particularly exemplify their expertise, accountability and effectiveness. Depending on the assignment, they get as close to the situation as is necessary, whilst remaining an independent practitioner. They may manage teams and projects, deal with crises and changes, or simply 'holding the fort'.
5. Exit. The interim manager, approaching project end, ensures that objectives have been met, that the client is satisfied. This stage may involve 'knowledge handover and training', determining and sourcing 'business as usual' successors, and 'sharing lessons learnt' in the process. The interim manager is focused on the success of the assignment and not simply the length of his/her own tenure, which means that this stage can be carried out professionally and objectively. Often this is the end of the interim manager/client relationship. Sometimes interim managers may continue to give occasional 'ad hoc' consultancy. Sometimes the interim manager is re-engaged on a follow-on or further assignment, starting the 'lifecycle' again.

== Uses ==
There are a number of different business situations that could result in the need for an interim manager. Typically these could be situations such as crisis management, sudden departure, illness, death, change management, managing change or transition, start-up and scale-up businesses, sabbaticals, MBOs and IPOs, mergers and acquisitions, and project management. The functions of an interim manager are almost endless, thus the scope of an interim manager's skill set is quite unique.

The interim management concept has taken root in the UK, Germany, and Belgium, and is spreading elsewhere, most notably in Australia, the US, France, and Ireland. In Spain recruitment increased by 68% in 2011, according to Michael Page Interim management, and since 2013 there is a first association called "Association Interim Management Spain". In Nigeria, the Institute Of Corporate and Interim Management has been approved by The Federal Ministry Of Education and established under Federal Government Decree No. 1 of 1990, to promote Corporate and Interim Management practice in Africa.

== Fractional executive ==
One type of interim executive is a fractional executive. Fractional executives are professionals who offer their management services to organizations on a part-time contract basis, also known as fractional work. These executives usually have extensive experience in the business environment in roles such as chairman, owner, CEO, senior vice president, vice president, or director. Their skills may be focused in one discipline or more broad, depending on their experience.

Fractional executives can work as independent contractors or as part of a fractional firm. However, they are not consultants because they take an active leadership role in the company that hires them, implementing changes and guiding the organization just as their full-time colleagues would. They are typically hired on a long-term basis and usually with some form of retainer, but they do not work full-time for any specific organization.

This concept is gaining increasing popularity as companies seek to optimize resource utilization and bring in highly skilled executives as needed.

The popularity of the "fractional" executive model is expected to continue to grow as companies aim to optimize their resources and engage specialists on a flexible basis. With the support of major investors and the emergence of global communities, "fractional" executives are set to play an increasingly important role in the business world in the coming years.

== See also ==
- Acting (law), in law, a person acting in a position but not serving in the position on a permanent basis
- Caretaker government, also called interim government
