= Center for the Promotion of Imports =

Dutch government agency

The Center for the Promotion of Imports (Dutch: Centrum tot Bevordering van de Import uit ontwikkelingslanden) from developing countries (internationally known by its Dutch acronym CBI), an agency of the Ministry of Foreign Affairs of the Netherlands, was established in 1971. CBI is an Agency of the Netherlands Ministry of Foreign Affairs and part of the development cooperation effort of the foreign relations of the Netherlands.

CBI contributes to the economic development of developing countries by strengthening the competitiveness of companies from said countries, and connecting them to the markets of the European Union and EFTA. The primary clients and direct beneficiaries of CBI are (1) Exporters: companies who (wish to) export to Europe, (2) Business Support Organizations (BSOs) in developing countries, and (3)Importers / Outsourcers: companies in Europe who (wish to) buy from developing countries.

CBI offers a variety of market information tools to keep exporters and Business Support Organizations (BSOs) in developing countries in step with the latest development on the EU market. It includes relevant governmental, voluntary and non-tariff barrier information. It has an online facility that links well-versed suppliers in developing countries eligible for CBI assistance to reliable importing companies in the EU. Its export coaching activities are designed to assist entrepreneurs in developing countries in entering and succeeding on the European markets and/or consolidating or expanding their existing market share. CBI provides training for exporters and business support organizations on among others general export marketing and management, trade promotion, management of international trade fair participations and developing client-oriented market information systems.

CBI is also involved in institutional support for capacity building for selected business support organizations in export marketing and management, market information systems, institutional development and export diversification.
