= Shamrock Buses =

British bus operating company

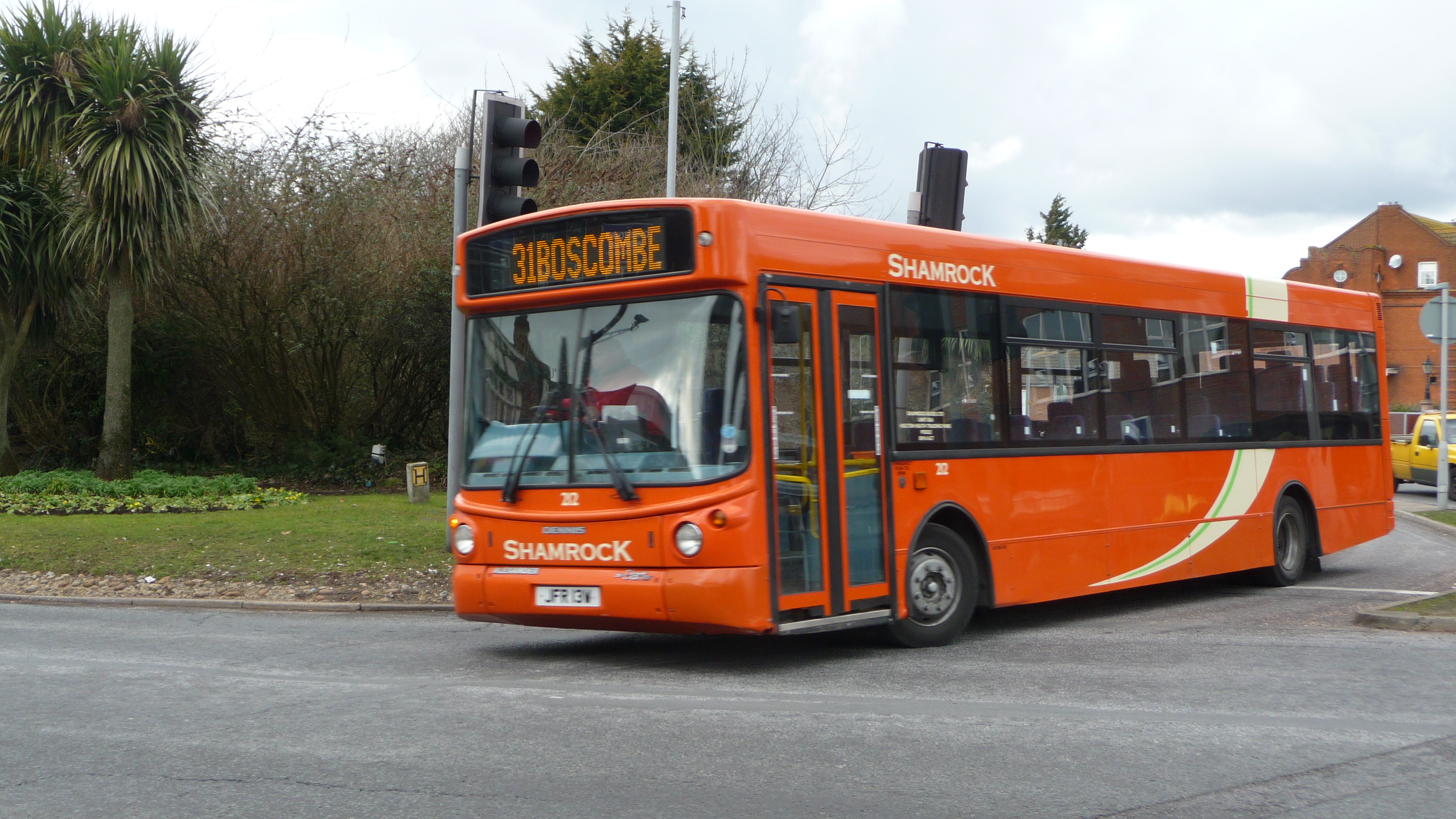
- Alexander ALX200 bodied Dennis Dart SLF in Christchurch in February 2010
- Founded: 2002
- Ceased operation: 2011
- Headquarters: Poole
- Service area: Dorset
- Fleet: 38 (February 2009)
- Website: Shamrock Buses - Web Archive

Shamrock Buses was an English bus operator based in Poole. It operated contracted routes in Poole, Bournemouth, and the surrounding area. It was formed in 2002 to fund the Bournemouth Passenger Transport Association's museum fleet, but collapsed in July 2011.

== History ==
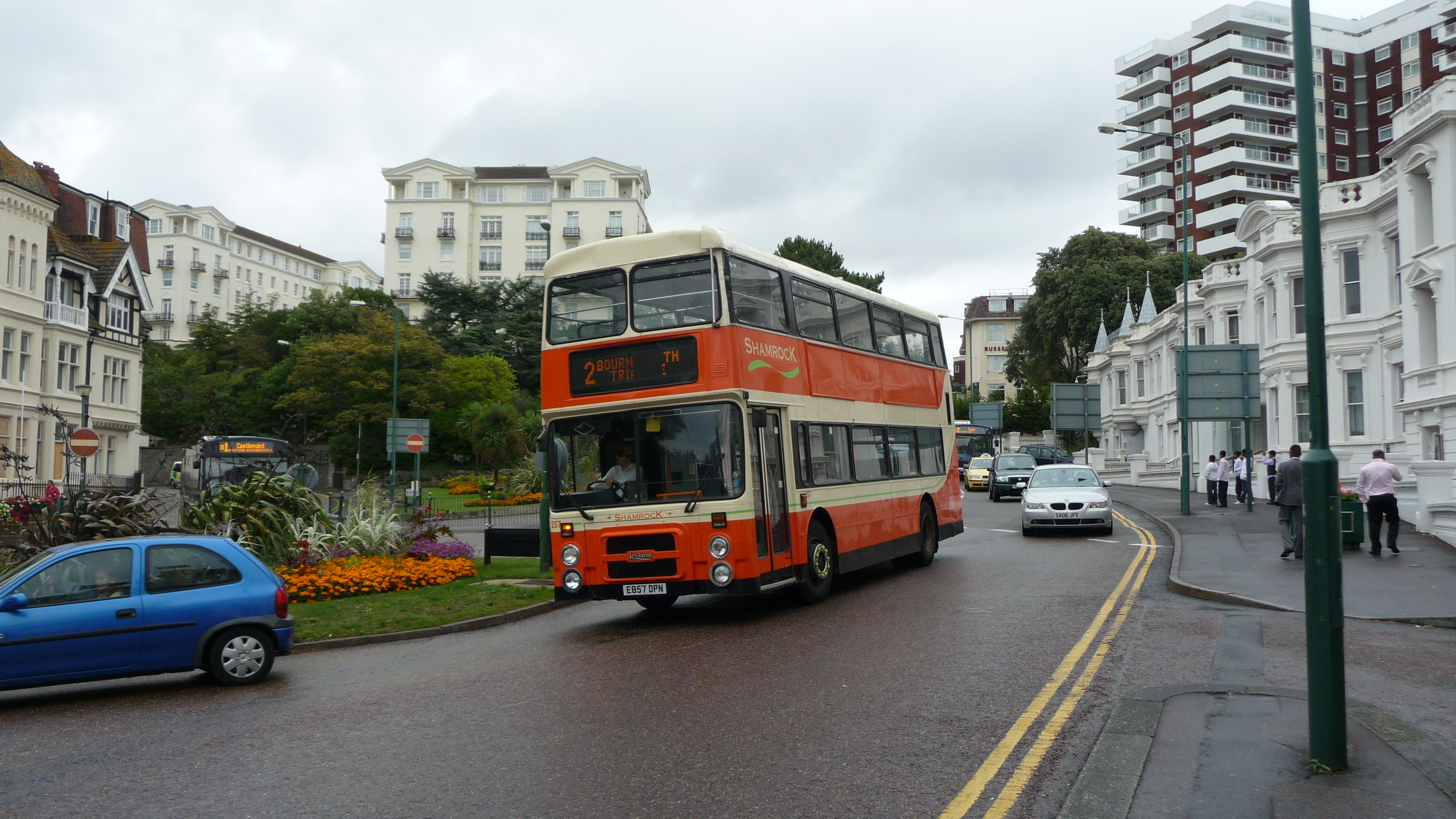
Northern Counties bodied Leyland Olympian in Bournemouth in July 2009

Shamrock Buses was established in 2002 to help create funds for the maintenance and restoration of the Bournemouth Passenger Transport Association (BPTA) museum fleet. The BPTA had previously operated a small number of routes in competition with Yellow Buses between 1993 and 1994, and had co-operated with the company to run a joint heritage operation, Christchurch Buses, which closed in 2000.

Its original purpose was to operate contracted services and to use the money generated by those services for the BPTA. The trading name of Shamrock Buses and fleet livery of orange and cream were inspired by Shamrock & Rambler, a coach company based in the Bournemouth area until its closure in 1989. Its fleet initially consisted of four Daimler Fleetlines; these were replaced by newer Leyland Olympians a year later.

In August 2005 the company expanded its school bus operation by taking over five routes from other local operators.

From early 2009, Shamrock Buses invested in buying a few second hand single deck low floor buses for the bus services run on contract to Bournemouth and Poole Borough Councils. These were used on route 8, which the company began operating when Poole-based independent Roadliner collapsed in August 2009.

On 6 July 2011, Shamrock Buses ceased trading. Around forty jobs were lost and five schools left without transport for students. The administrator who closed the company cited high fuel costs and competition as the main reasons for the company's failure. Shamrock's routes were taken over by Wilts & Dorset and Yellow Buses.

== Fleet ==
As at February 2009 the fleet consisted of 38 buses.
