= Wardsville, Ontario =

Wardsville is a rural community in the municipality of Southwest Middlesex in Middlesex County, Ontario, Canada.

Wardsville is best known as the site of the Battle of Longwoods (March 4, 1814) during the War of 1812. Battle Hill was designated as a National Historic Site of Canada in 1924.

== History ==
The area that is now Wardsville lies within the traditional territories of Indigenous nations of the western Great Lakes region. It was included in the lands acquired by the Crown under McKee's Purchase of 1790 (also known as the McKee Treaty and Treaty 2)—signed by chiefs of the Odawa, Potawatomi, Ojibwa, and Wendat nations.

In 1794, the Crown granted land to George Ward, a former British Army sergeant born in Queen's County, Ireland. The Hesse District Land Board awarded him Lot No. 9 in the Third Township, a parcel on the north side of the Thames River.

Ward's lot was bisected by an Indigenous trail known as the "Road through the Long Woods" (and later the Long Woods / Longwoods Road). By the early 1800s, the road had become a principal overland route between the Detroit frontier and the British administrative centre at London. Ward’s property lay roughly midway between the two.

With approval obtained through petition to the colonial authorities, Ward built a stopping place at the point where the Long Woods Road crossed Paint Creek. This waystation—known widely as Ward’s Station—was the beginning of the community of Wardsville.

George Ward and his wife, Margaret Shaw, are buried in the Wardsville Municipal Cemetery. Their monument describes them as "the first settlers in this district and from whom the community derived its name."

== Demographics ==
Wardsville had a population of 420 in the Statistics Canada 2021 Census, a 9.9% increase from the previous figure in 2016.

== See also ==
- List of communities in Ontario
