= Virtual CFO =

Virtual CFO (or vCFO for short) stands for virtual chief financial officer. A virtual CFO is an outsourced service provider offering high-skill assistance in the financial requirements of an organization, just like a chief financial officer does for large organizations. A virtual CFO may be a single person or an entity.

== Target market ==
The mushrooming of the startup ecosystem has generated specialized service providers which fit the requirement of startups. Virtual CFO is one such specialized service provider. Startups normally do not have the resources to hire a full-time CFO. Startups prefer keeping fixed costs low, and having an outsourced service provides them with the flexibility of choosing services as and when required. A Virtual CFO provides strategic, value add services to a startup that cannot be provided by an accountant. In the United States, VCFO services are typically used by small to medium businesses with annual sales in excess of $1 million.

== Services offered ==
The primary role of a chief financial officer in any organization is to oversee the financial planning, maintain and report on the financial activities, and manage financial risk of the business. A virtual CFO provides the same services but since the common clientele of a virtual CFO are small businesses and startups, there are certain more services that are expected of them. Services offered by a virtual CFO often follow the financial pyramid of needs. At the basic level, a virtual CFO is expected to be the bookkeeper of the client and has to take responsibility for the accuracy of the account books and interpret the financial information from the accounting data to the client. They make take responsibility for executing or overseeing the reporting process. On the more strategic side, they are the financial and strategic sparring partners of the CEO. They are also responsible for suggesting measures to control expenditure and acquire capital at a low cost.

== Practice ==
Small companies may need a controller on a weekly or fortnightly basis. Virtual CFOs also offer one-time help with strategic transactions, financial processes, business plans, and budgeting.

In the USA, Virtual CFOs earn between $55 and $250 an hour, as per their level of expertise. Clients are invoiced at an hourly or monthly rate depending on the nature of service. Most firms provide tailor-made services and the service charges vary from client to client

The adoption of Virtual Chief Financial Officer (CFO) services in India began gaining traction around 2009-2010, driven largely by the country's growing start-up and small and medium enterprise (SME) sectors. Emerging companies utilized these outsourced services to delegate complex financial management, allowing them to focus resources on core business operations.

In Germany, virtual or part-time CFOs (in German called "Teilzeit-CFOs") are getting more and more traction, especially with startups, even though many SMEs still rely mostly only on their tax advisors, who have a good knowledge of German tax laws, but lack management and operational experience.

However, this practice should be differentiated from finance outsourcing. Finance outsourcing is commonly understood to indicate a transnational outsourcing process, in which the financial management of companies is generally outsourced from Western countries to low-wage group countries, like India, South Africa, Brazil, etc.

== Professional qualifications ==
There is currently no official requirement as to the qualifications that a virtual CFO should hold. However, it is generally expected for a virtual CFO to have finance related university degree, professional accountancy qualification, and sufficient relevant experience.

In addition, virtual CFOs can obtain the Qualified Cloud CFO (QCCFO) professional certification provided by the International Association of Qualified Cloud Accountants (IAQCA) which is specifically focused on the knowledge that financial professionals need to deliver their services within the Internet and Cloud environment.
