= National Register of Historic Places listings in Callaway County, Missouri =

Location of Callaway County in Missouri

This is a list of the National Register of Historic Places listings in Callaway County, Missouri.

This is intended to be a complete list of the properties and districts on the National Register of Historic Places in Callaway County, Missouri, United States. Latitude and longitude coordinates are provided for many National Register properties and districts; these locations may be seen together in a map.

There are 22 properties and districts listed on the National Register in the county, including 2 National Historic Landmarks.

This National Park Service list is complete through NPS recent listings posted May 30, 2025.

== Current listings ==
	Name on the Register	Image	Date listed	Location	City or town	Description
1	M. Fred Bell Rental Cottage	M. Fred Bell Rental Cottage	July 10, 1997 (#97000627)	302 E. Fifth St. 38°50′49″N 91°56′39″W	Fulton	
2	M. Fred Bell Speculative Cottage	M. Fred Bell Speculative Cottage	June 30, 1995 (#95000780)	304 E. Fifth St. 38°50′49″N 91°56′39″W	Fulton	
3	Brandon-Bell-Collier House	Brandon-Bell-Collier House	December 24, 1998 (#98001545)	207 W. Ninth St. 38°51′17″N 91°56′42″W	Fulton	
4	George Washington Carver School	George Washington Carver School	December 2, 1996 (#96001381)	909 Westminster; 38°51′15″N 91°57′13″W	Fulton	
5	Cote Sans Dessein Archeological Site		May 27, 1971 (#71000462)	Address Restricted	Tebbetts	
6	Court Street Historic Residential District	Court Street Historic Residential District	August 15, 2007 (#07000817)	Roughly along Court St. between St. Louis and 10th Sts. 38°51′11″N 91°56′51″W	Fulton	
7	Downtown Fulton Historic District	Downtown Fulton Historic District	July 7, 2004 (#04000668)	Roughly bounded by 4th St., Market, 7th St. and Jefferson Ave. 38°50′55″N 91°56′56″W	Fulton	
8	John Augustus Hockaday House	John Augustus Hockaday House	September 17, 1980 (#80002321)	105 Hockaday Ave. 38°50′31″N 91°56′55″W	Fulton	
9	Mealy Mounds Archeological Site		January 25, 1971 (#71000461)	Address Restricted	Mokane	
10	Middle River School		April 1, 2024 (#100010147)	6587 County Road 305; 38°49′20″N 92°00′50″W	Fulton	
11	Moore's Mill Battlefield	Moore's Mill Battlefield	May 4, 2015 (#15000196)	Along Auxvasse Creek; 38°54′35″N 91°50′48″W	Calwood	Site of the Civil War Battle of Moore's Mill. Battle site is listed as "Address Restricted"; geolocator is for historical marker.
12	Robert Newsom Farmstead		May 29, 2025 (#100011846)	Address Restricted	New Bloomfield	
13	Oakley Chapel African Methodist Episcopal Church		December 17, 2008 (#08001192)	County Road 485 at the County Road 486 junction 38°37′51″N 91°57′51″W	Tebbetts	
14	Pitcher Store	Pitcher Store	March 12, 2001 (#01000235)	8513 Pitcher Rd. 38°45′00″N 91°57′58″W	Fulton	
15	Research Cave		October 15, 1966 (#66000415)	address restricted	Portland	
16	Richland Christian Church		February 16, 2001 (#01000122)	5301 Callaway Cty. Rd. 220; 38°55′52″N 91°59′33″W	Kingdom City	
17	Robnett-Payne House	Robnett-Payne House	September 17, 1998 (#98001136)	223 East Fifth St. 38°50′51″N 91°56′41″W	Fulton	
18	Westminster College Gymnasium	Westminster College Gymnasium	May 23, 1968 (#68000030)	Westminster College campus 38°50′54″N 91°57′23″W	Fulton	Winston Churchill warned here of an "iron curtain" descending
19	Westminster College Historic District	Westminster College Historic District	April 12, 1982 (#82004633)	Off Westminster Ave. 38°50′53″N 91°57′22″W	Fulton	
20	White Cloud Presbyterian Church and Cemetery	White Cloud Presbyterian Church and Cemetery	October 12, 2010 (#10000817)	South side of Missouri Route F at intersection with County Road 232; 38°52′31″N 92°04′18″W	Fulton	
21	Dr. George M. Willing House	Dr. George M. Willing House	October 3, 1980 (#80002322)	211 Jefferson St. 38°50′44″N 91°57′02″W	Fulton	
22	Winston Churchill Memorial	Winston Churchill Memorial	March 16, 1972 (#72000708)	7th St. and Westminster Ave. 38°51′00″N 91°57′16″W	Fulton	

== See also ==
- List of National Historic Landmarks in Missouri
- National Register of Historic Places listings in Missouri
