= Fulton Speech =

"Iron Curtain" speech by Winston Churchill in Missouri, US

The Sinews of Peace
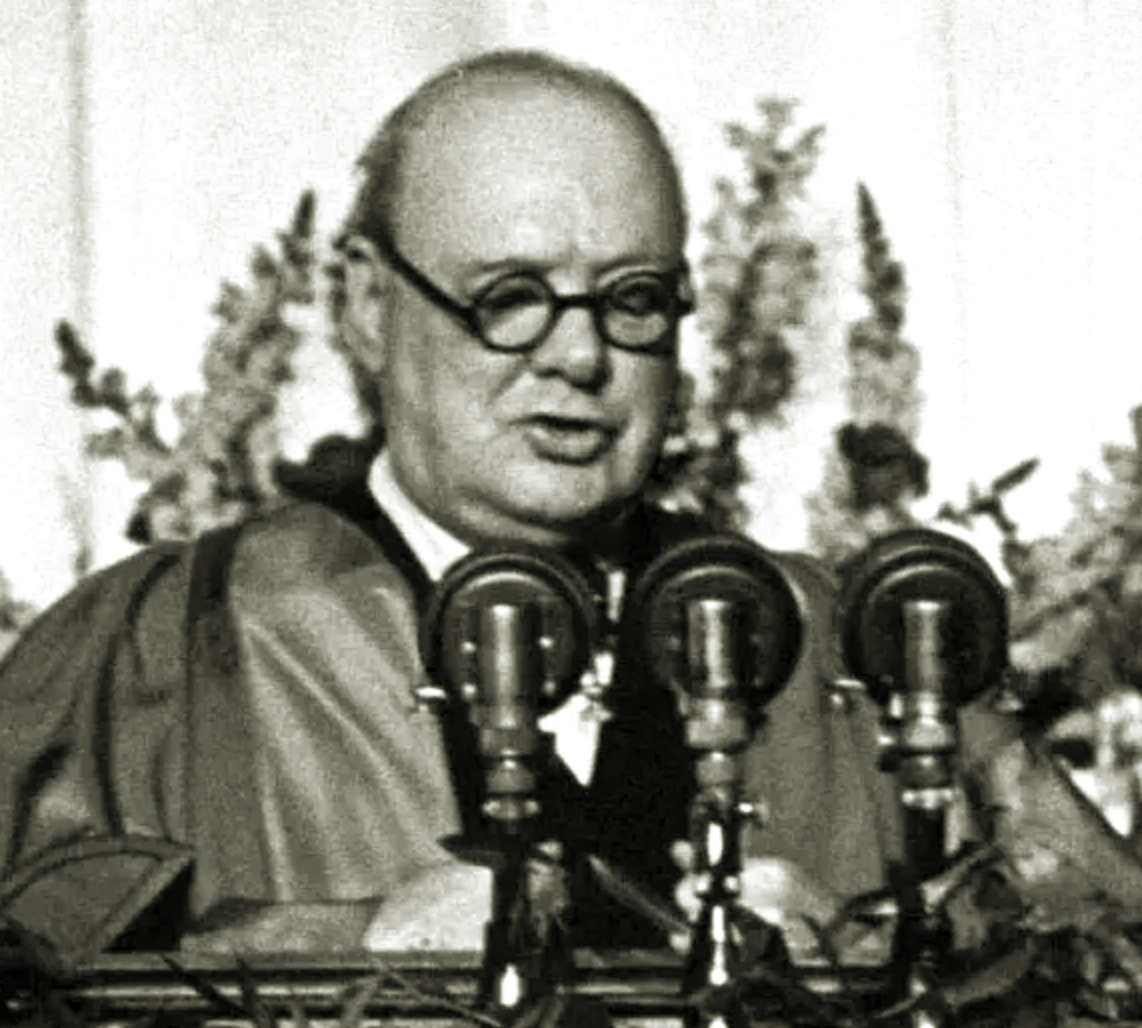
- Churchill delivers the speech at Westminster College.
- Date: March 5, 1946
- Duration: 46 minutes
- Venue: Westminster College Gymnasium
- Location: Fulton, Missouri
- Also known as: Fulton speech, Iron Curtain speech
- Type: Speech (lecture)
- Theme: Anti-Communism, international relations

The "Fulton Speech" (also known as the "Iron Curtain" speech or by its title "The Sinews of Peace") was a 46-minute lecture delivered by Winston Churchill on March 5, 1946, at Westminster College in Fulton, Missouri, United States, to an audience of 1,500 listeners. It has been considered by some as signalling the beginning of the Cold War. Contrary to popular misconceptions, Churchill was not the Prime Minister of the United Kingdom at the time; after the defeat of the Conservative Party in the July 5, 1945, election, he was the Leader of the Opposition and was in the U.S. not on an official visit but as a private citizen on vacation.

== Historical context ==
The international situation after World War II and the death of Franklin D. Roosevelt was uncertain. Formally, the Grand Alliance still existed. In practice, however, ever-deepening contradictions between the USSR and its Western partners were becoming apparent. Joseph Stalin claimed a leading role, constantly emphasizing that as the main victor over fascism and the main sufferer from it, the USSR had more rights in deciding post-war arrangements, especially in Europe and Asia. There was active expansion of communist influence in Eastern Europe and Southeast Asia, as well as growing influence of communists in Western Europe. In Greece, a civil war was underway between communists and anti-communist forces. The USSR presented territorial claims to Turkey and delayed the withdrawal of troops from Iran. When Churchill delivered his speech, the crisis had reached its peak, and President Truman even threatened to use nuclear weapons. General Eisenhower's headquarters had even prepared the "Totality" plan – the first of the American war plans against the USSR (in England, such planning began on Churchill's initiative as early as spring 1945 – see Operation Unthinkable).

At the same time, in the West, among the broad masses as well as in liberal and socialist circles, there remained a belief that the friendly and allied relations with the USSR, established during the war, could be maintained. The claims of the USSR were viewed in these circles as a legitimate concern for its own security and the need for compensation for the suffering and sacrifices borne by the Soviet people during the war.

Churchill, originally a staunch anti-communist, viewed these tendencies with great dissatisfaction. He understood that Great Britain, which had been the leading European power before the war, no longer was. The countries of Western Europe, devastated by war and themselves under strong communist influence, would not be able to effectively resist the expansion of the USSR. Only the United States, the least affected by the war and possessing a monopoly on nuclear weapons at the time, could stop the Soviet Union. It is no coincidence that his first foreign policy speech as Leader of the Opposition in November 1945 was devoted to "important problems in our relations with the United States".

== Background ==
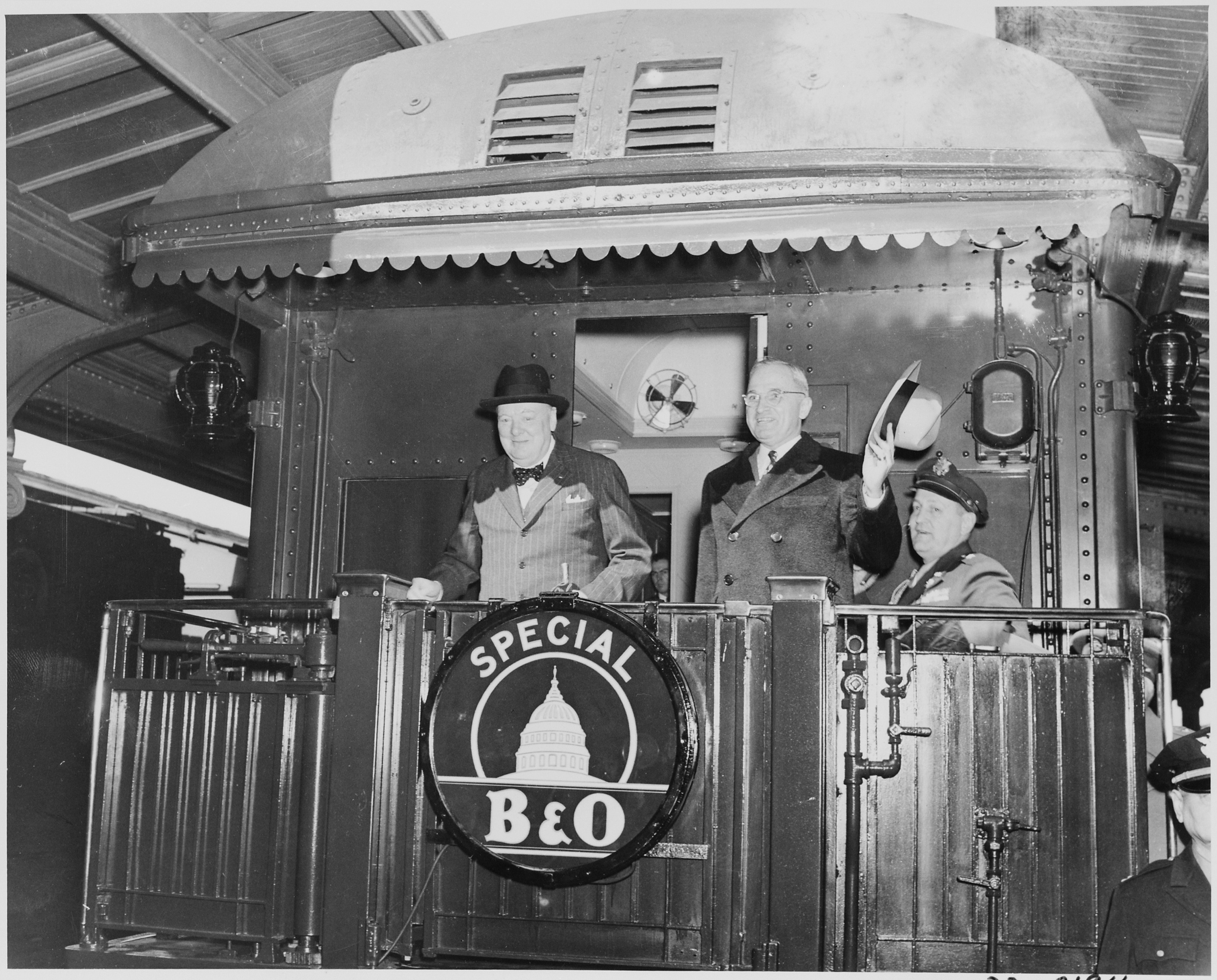
Churchill and Truman depart for Fulton.

Churchill had been developing the main theses outlined in the speech since 1943. As N. A. Narochnitskaya writes in her book Yalta-1945. Blueprints for a New World, even before the Crimean Conference, the main outlines of Churchill's post-war plans were placed on Stalin's desk. On his doctors' advice, Churchill spent the winter of 1945–1946 in the U.S. As early as December, he had in principle accepted an invitation from Westminster College to deliver a lecture on "international relations." Fulton was the hometown of President Truman and an object of his patriotic feelings. Churchill set the condition that Truman must accompany him to Fulton and be present for the speech.

On March 4, Churchill and Truman boarded a special train and arrived in Fulton on March 5, where Churchill was given a triumphal welcome. On the train, Churchill finalized and edited the text of his speech, which occupied 50 small-format pages. He gave the text to Truman, who called the speech "splendid": in his words, "although it will cause a stir, it can only do good." However, Truman officially expressed no relation to Churchill's thoughts and appeals: Churchill, as a private citizen, had greater freedom of action, while Truman left himself the possibility, if necessary, to distance himself from the speech's content, attributing it to Churchill's private opinion. In this sense, the Fulton speech had a distinctly provocative character, designed to probe and stir public opinion.

== Title ==
The title of Churchill's speech plays on the English phrase "sinews of war," meaning the resources for waging war (literally "the tendons of war"), in which the word "war" is replaced by "peace." The original working title was "World Peace." Thus, on February 14, Churchill wrote to McCluer:

I am afraid I have not yet come to a final conclusion about the title of the address, but I think it may be "World Peace."

== Content ==
At the beginning of the Fulton speech, Churchill stated that from now on "the United States stands at this time at the pinnacle of world power." "This is a solemn moment for the American democracy," but also an extremely responsible position. Opposing it are two main enemies – "war and tyranny." The United Nations had failed to keep the peace, and therefore it would be "criminal madness" to share the secret of the atomic bomb, which the US, Britain, and Canada alone then possessed, with them. To become a real guarantor of peace, the United Nations must have its own armed forces – primarily air forces – formed on an international basis. "I wished," said Churchill, "to see this done after the first world war, and I devoutly trust it may be done forthwith."

Churchill then said:

We cannot afford to draw from the freedoms enjoyed in the United States, in the British Empire, the conclusion that these freedoms do not exist in a considerable number of countries, some of which are very powerful. In these countries control over the ordinary people is enforced from above by pervasive police governments to a degree which is contradictory to every principle of democracy. The only instrument capable at this historical moment of preventing war and resisting tyranny is the "fraternal association of the English-speaking peoples." This means a special relationship between the British Commonwealth and Empire and the United States of America.

In the second part of the speech, Churchill turned to an analysis of the situation in Europe and Asia:

A shadow has fallen upon the scenes so lately lighted by the Allied victory. Nobody knows what Soviet Russia and its Communist international organisation intends to do in the immediate future, or what are the limits, if any, to their expansive tendencies. I have a strong admiration and regard for the valiant Russian people and for my wartime comrade Marshal Stalin… We understand the Russian need to be secure on her western frontiers by the removal of all possibility of German aggression. We welcome Russia to her rightful place among the leading nations of the world. Above all, we welcome, or should welcome, constant, frequent and growing contacts between the Russian people and our own people on both sides of the Atlantic. It is my duty, however, and I am sure you would not wish me not to state the facts as I see them to you.

As Churchill saw these facts, he outlined them in the central paragraph of the speech:

From Stettin in the Baltic to Trieste in the Adriatic, an Iron Curtain has descended across the Continent. Behind that line lie all the capitals of the ancient states of Central and Eastern Europe. Warsaw, Berlin, Prague, Vienna, Budapest, Belgrade, Bucharest and Sofia, all these famous cities and the populations around them lie in what I must call the Soviet sphere, and all are subject in one form or another, not only to Soviet influence but to a very high and, in some cases, increasing measure of control from Moscow… The Communist parties, which were very small in all these Eastern States of Europe, have been raised to pre-eminence and power far beyond their numbers and are seeking everywhere to obtain totalitarian control.

The danger of communism, Churchill declared, was growing everywhere, "with the exception of the British Commonwealth and the United States where Communism is in its infancy." He said that "in a great number of countries, far from the Russian frontiers and throughout the world, Communist fifth columns are established and work in complete unity and absolute obedience to the directions they receive from the Communist centre."

Recalling the end of the First World War, Churchill reminded that in those days there was confidence and great hope that the time for wars was over forever. But now he did not feel such confidence and hope. However, Churchill said, "I repulse the idea that a new war is inevitable… I do not believe that Soviet Russia desires war. What they desire is the fruits of war and the indefinite expansion of their power and doctrines." And further: "From what I have seen of our Russian friends and allies during the war, I am convinced that there is nothing they admire so much as strength, and there is nothing for which they have less respect than for weakness, especially military weakness. For that reason the old doctrine of a balance of power is unsound."

Churchill emphasized:

There never was a war in history easier to prevent by timely action than the one which has just desolated such great areas of the globe. That mistake cannot be repeated. And for this it is necessary, under the aegis of the United Nations and on the basis of the military strength of the English-speaking fraternity, to find an understanding with Russia. Then the broad highway to the future will be clear, not only for us but for all, not only for our time, but for a century to come.

Although this speech by Churchill is often referred to by another name – "The Iron Curtain" – Churchill did not include the actual paragraph about the "iron curtain" in the text distributed to the press in advance. The stenographers and reporters, not expecting him to deviate from the text, almost missed this historic paragraph. Only after the ceremony did they reconstruct it as best they could from what each had managed to record. Since the technology of the time did not allow for an immediate high-quality audio recording of the speech, the text was finally clarified only after Churchill's and Truman's voice timbres were restored and the recording was cleaned of extraneous noise by the specially hired New York company "Audio-Scription". The paragraph in which Churchill mentions the need for a new union in Europe ("…safety in the world requires a new unity in Europe, from which no nation should be permanently outcast") was also absent from the pre-printed and distributed text. This idea was developed in more detail in Churchill's speech in September 1946 in Zurich and formulated the idea of a European Union and called for the formation of an organization later named the Council of Europe; in 1949, Churchill himself participated in its first assembly.

== Consequences and contemporary assessments ==
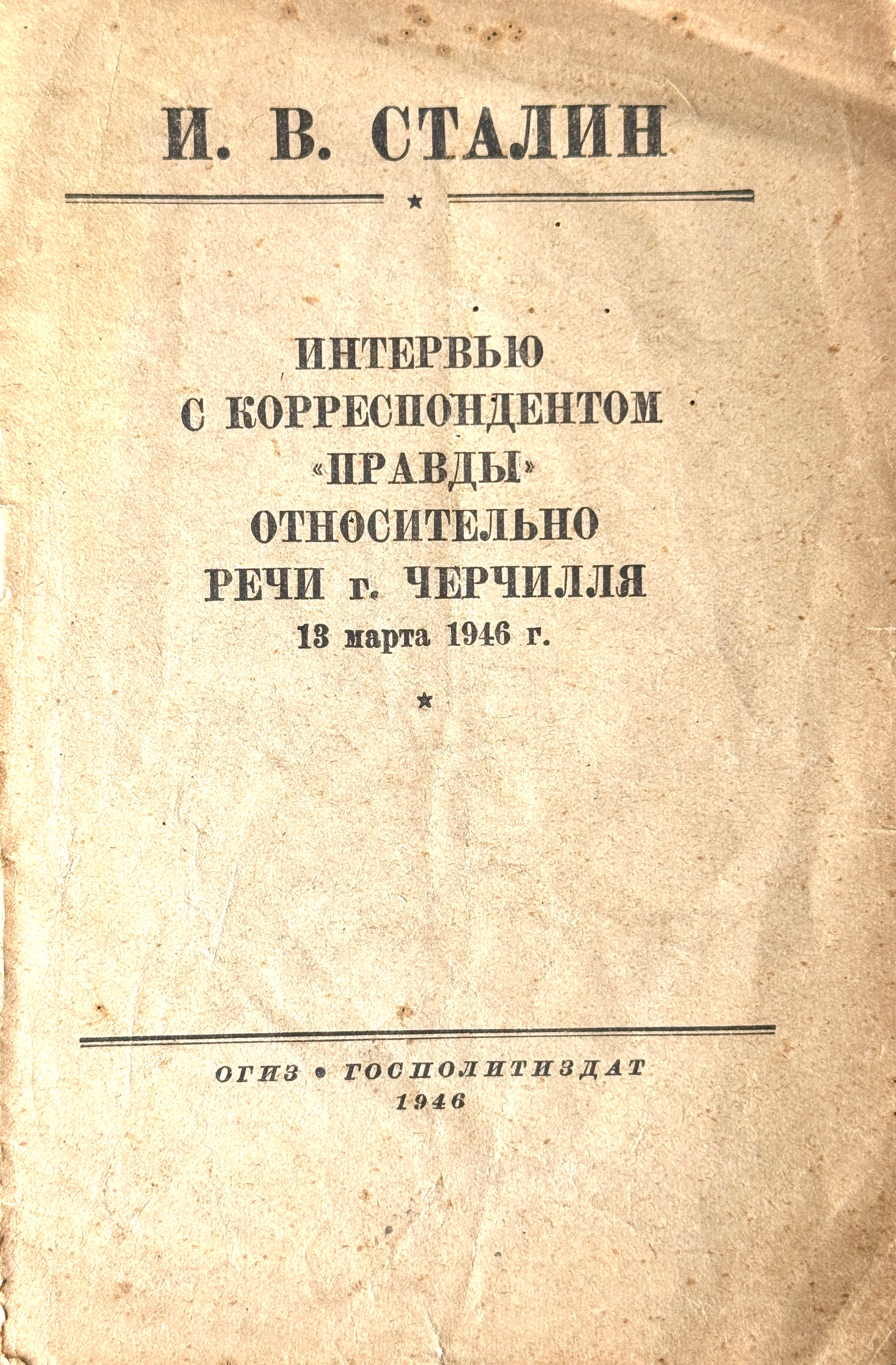
Soviet publication of J. Stalin's interview with a Pravda correspondent regarding Churchill's speech (March 13, 1946)

Joseph Stalin was informed about the speech almost immediately. TASS ciphers and translations were on the desks of Stalin and Molotov the next day. For a couple of days, with characteristic caution, Stalin awaited the reaction abroad. Then followed an article by academician, three-time Stalin Prize first-degree laureate Yevgeny Tarle with a historical overview of British foreign policy and an article in Izvestia titled "Churchill Rattles His Saber." All the intricacies surrounding Churchill's speech are described in detail by MGIMO history professor V. Pechatnov in the journal Istochnik No. 1 (32) for 1998. In the USSR, the text of the speech was not translated in full but was described in detail in a TASS report of March 11, 1946.

On March 13, in an interview with Pravda, Stalin carefully balanced warnings about the threat of a possible war with calls for restraint, but unequivocally placed Churchill alongside Hitler, stating that in his speech Churchill had called the West to war with the USSR and also accused him of racism:

Mr. Churchill and his friends bear a striking resemblance in this respect to Hitler and his friends. Hitler began the business of unleashing war by proclaiming a racial theory, declaring that only German-speaking people constituted a superior nation. Mr. Churchill begins the business of unleashing war also with a racial theory, asserting that only English-speaking nations are superior nations, called upon to decide the destinies of the entire world. The German racial theory led Hitler and his friends to the conclusion that the Germans, as the only superior nation, should dominate over other nations. The English racial theory leads Mr. Churchill and his friends to the conclusion that the English-speaking nations, as the only superior ones, should dominate over the rest of the nations of the world.

Accusations of "Anglo-Saxon" racism against Churchill became commonplace in Soviet propaganda of the late 1940s and early 1950s; they were even used by Marr-ist linguists during the late 1940s campaign against Soviet linguists specializing in the English language.

For many, the week would become the beginning of the "Cold War." The writer Mikhail Prishvin assessed Churchill's speech and Stalin's response to it in his diary entries as follows:

My head is spinning from Churchill's speech and Stalin's answer: Churchill acts as a person with all the familiar human personal qualities. In Stalin's words there is no personal man at all, nor is there a superman with hysterical rooster-like jumps and shouts. Stalin speaks impersonally, like a mechanical robot. And if Churchill spoke as he 'wanted,' Stalin speaks as 'it is necessary.' Will there be war or not? According to the open and bold words of the leaders, it seems not: everything is too open. But judging by the facts, especially in Greece, the war has already begun.

…

Everything depends for now on the USA, but will America go to war with the USSR over England, and we won't rush at a bomb. For now [it is unclear] what will happen next, for now everything is limited to a duel between Churchill and someone like Tarle and the subsequent expansion of our political horizons resulting from this open dispute.

On March 14, 1946, German Lieutenant General Erich Reuter (who was then in Soviet captivity) addressed the Soviet authorities with the following:

…I request to be used, if necessary, in the service of the Soviet Union against England – the old enemy of Germany.

The 42-year-old Reuter recalled that during World War I, as a schoolboy, he along with other children repeated the slogan "Gott strafe England" ("God punish England") every day. Reuter said he had lost his apartment in Berlin due to an English air raid and nearly lost his family. Reuter noted that Churchill "now wants to impose a war on the Soviet Union just as he, unfortunately, succeeded in doing twice with Germany".

== Historians' assessments ==
Russian researcher Nikolai Zlobin notes the "foresight and political instinct of Churchill" expressed in this speech. In his opinion, "his [Churchill's] foresight for the next 40 years of the structure and character of international relations in general and Soviet-American relations in particular was fully confirmed".

== See also ==
- X Article, 1947
- Truman Doctrine, 1947
- Iron Curtain
