= Ron McBride (disambiguation) =

Ron McBride (born 1939) is an American former college football coach.

Ron McBride or McBryde may also refer to:

- Ron McBride (running back) (born 1948), American former NFL player
- Ron McBryde (1941–1989), Canadian politician
