= Murder of Elizabeth Olten =

2009 crime in Missouri, United States

- Location of St. Martins within Cole County
- Location: St. Martins, Missouri, U.S.
- Date: October 21, 2009; 17 years ago
- Attack type: Child-on-child murder by strangulation, stabbing
- Weapon: Knife
- Victim: Elizabeth Olten
- Perpetrator: Alyssa Bustamante
- Motive: Homicidal ideation, thrill
- Charges: First-degree murder (charge dropped after plea deal)
- Verdict: Plead guilty
- Convictions: Second-degree murder, armed criminal action
- Sentence: Life imprisonment for second-degree murder plus consecutive 30 years for armed criminal action (with possibility of parole).
- Litigation: Wrongful death lawsuit settled for $5 million

Elizabeth Olten was a 9-year-old American girl who was murdered by her neighbor Alyssa Bustamante, who was 15 at the time, in St. Martins, Missouri on October 21, 2009.

Bustamante lured Olten into the woods before strangling and stabbing her to death. Bustamante murdered Olten simply due to homicidal ideation and to experience killing someone. She was later indicted and plead guilty to second-degree murder and armed criminal action and was sentenced to life in prison with the possibility of parole in 2024 for second-degree murder. She was sentenced to life in prison plus 30 years, and the two charges carry consecutive sentences.

Bustamante was controversially permitted a parole hearing in 2024, due to Senate Bill 26, a law meant to allow juvenile offenders earlier parole as part of jail reform efforts. Senate Bill 26 blocked those convicted of first degree murder from seeking this parole, but not those convicted of second degree murder. Senate Bill 26 was later amended by Senate Bill 754, which blocks those convicted of second degree murder from this parole as well. Governor Mike Parson did not sign Senate Bill 754 in time to prevent the hearing. She was denied parole. If granted parole from the life sentence, Bustamante will still have to serve at least half of the consecutive 30-year sentence for her armed criminal action conviction before she is eligible for parole. This puts her earliest possible release date in 2044, when she will be 50 years old.

== Murder ==
Elizabeth Kay Olten (December 15, 1999 - October 21, 2009) lived four houses down from Bustamante. In the evening of October 21, 2009, Bustamante convinced her younger sister Emma to bring Olten to the forest by their homes to hang out. Upon Olten's arrival, Bustamante left her sister alone outside while she lured Olten into the forest, strangled her, slit her throat, and stabbed her eight times in the chest. Bustamante then buried Olten's body in a shallow grave that she had dug in the woods a week prior to the murder. The hole was located behind her house and poorly concealed with leaves, and was discovered just two days after Olten's death.

She then attended a church dance (Bustamante was actively involved in her local Church of Jesus Christ of Latter-Day Saints) while police searched for Olten.

== Perpetrator ==
Alyssa Bustamante
- Born: Alyssa Dailene Bustamante; January 28, 1994 (age 32)
- Status: Incarcerated
- Convictions: Second-degree murder; Armed criminal action
- Penalty: Life imprisonment plus consecutive 30-year sentence

Details
- Victims: Elizabeth Kay Olten, aged 9
- Country: United States
- State: Missouri
- Location: St. Martins, Missouri
- Weapon: Knife
- Date apprehended: October 23, 2009
- Imprisoned at: Chillicothe Correctional Center, Chillicothe, Missouri

Bustamante's grandparents, Gary and Karen Brooke, took legal custody of her and her three younger siblings in 2002, since her mother Michelle had addiction issues and her father Caesar was serving time in prison for assault charges. Friends started noticing changes in Alyssa around 2007 when she was hospitalized after a suicide attempt. On her YouTube profile, she listed "cutting and killing people" under her hobbies. Alyssa had also posted a photograph of herself on social media with fake blood around her lips, pointing her index and middle finger in the shape of a gun to her head.

A personal journal was found in Alyssa's room, containing an entry with the date October 21, 2009. At first glance, forensic investigators could make out two words; slit and throat. The entry read (though later she attempted to scribble it out):

I just fucking killed someone. I strangled them and slit their throat and stabbed them now they're dead. I don't know how to feel atm. It was ahmazing [sic]. As soon as you get over the "ohmygawd, I can't do this" feeling, it's pretty enjoyable. I'm kinda nervous and shaky though right now. Kay, I gotta go to church now... lol.

== Trial, conviction, and appeal ==
Bustamante first appeared in court on November 17, 2009, where she pleaded not guilty and was indicted on first-degree murder and armed criminal action (due to using a knife to commit the murder). In January 2012, she took a plea deal for the lesser charges of second-degree murder and armed criminal action. A few weeks later, she was sentenced to life imprisonment with the possibility of parole for the murder and a consecutive sentence of 30 years for armed criminal action.

Her appeal against the sentence was denied in March 2014.

The victim's mother, Patricia Preiss, agreed to settle the lawsuit she filed against Bustamante. The terms of the agreement require Bustamante to disclose any compensation from case coverage to Preiss.

Bustamante was denied parole in July 2024. Her next parole hearing is scheduled for 2029. Even if granted parole from her life sentence for second-degree murder, Bustamante still must then serve her consecutive 30-year sentence for armed criminal action. However, due to her age at the time of her conviction, she will only have to serve 15 years of her consecutive sentence before becoming eligible for parole on it. Bustamante is additionally not on the "dangerous conviction list," so she will be granted good time if she follows all the rules. This allows her 15% of her time off.

Bustamante is currently imprisoned at the Chillicothe Correctional Center in Chillicothe, Missouri.

== In popular culture ==
On October 19, 2012, a thriller film loosely based on the case called My Name Is 'A' by Anonymous was released.

== See also ==
- List of solved missing person cases (post-2000)
