= Dr. George M. Willing House =

Historic house in Missouri, United States

- U.S. National Register of Historic Places
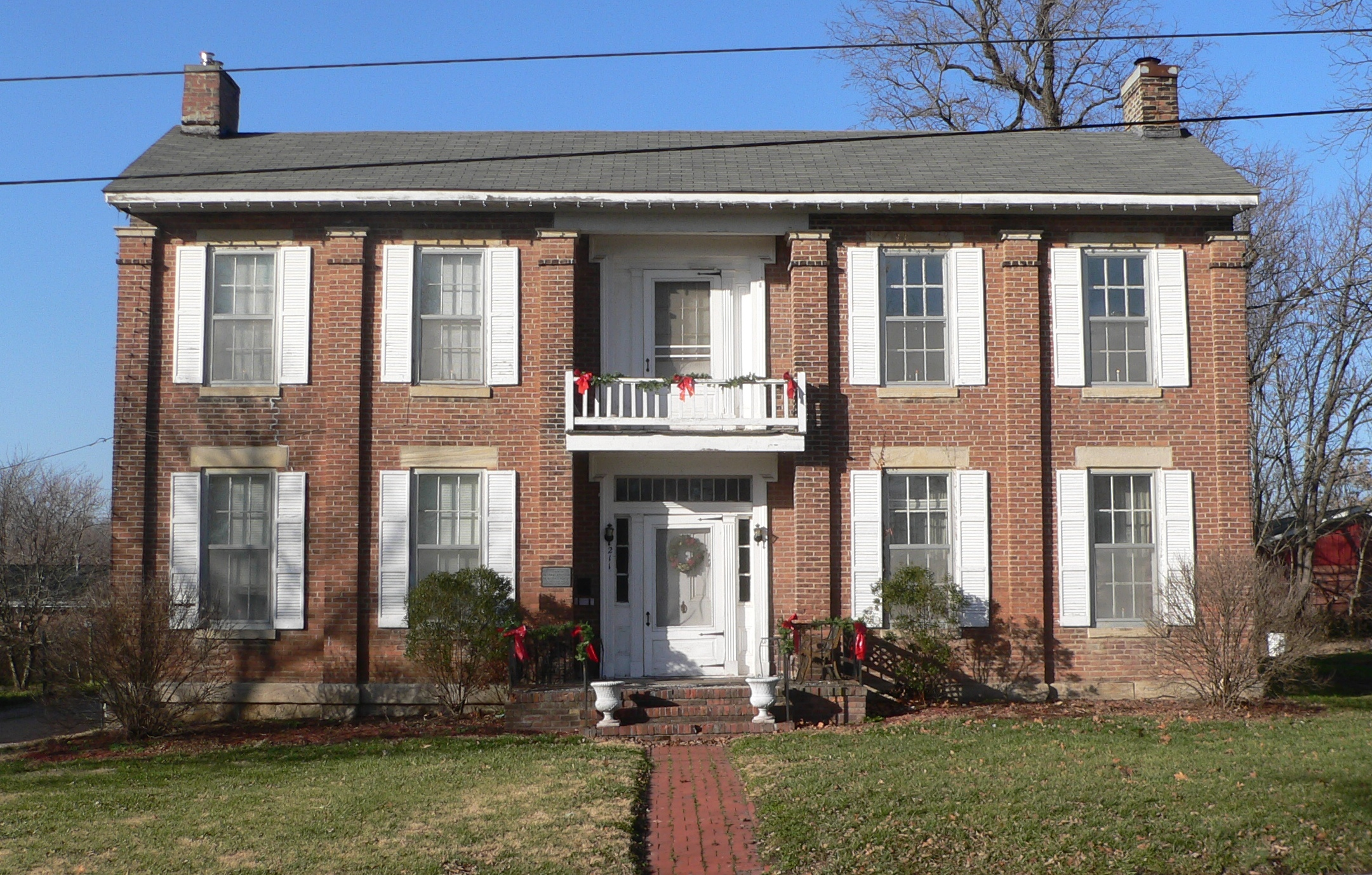
- George M. Willing house, December 2012

- Location within Missouri Location within the United States
- Location: 211 Jefferson St., Fulton, Missouri
- Coordinates: 38°50′44″N 91°57′1″W
- Area: 0.3 acres (0.12 ha)
- Built: c. 1855
- Architectural style: Greek Revival
- NRHP reference No.: 80002322
- Added to NRHP: October 3, 1980

Dr. George M. Willing House, also known as the Fleming Home and Joseph Denton Home, is a historic home located at Fulton, Callaway County, Missouri. It was built about 1855, and is a two-story, five-bay, Greek Revival style brick dwelling. It has a side-gable roof and features six colossal pilasters which divide the front facade and a massive hand carved solid walnut circular stairway in the front-entrance hall.

The house was listed on the National Register of Historic Places in 1980.
