= Murder of Patricia Jeschke =

1980 murder in St. Joseph, Missouri, U.S.

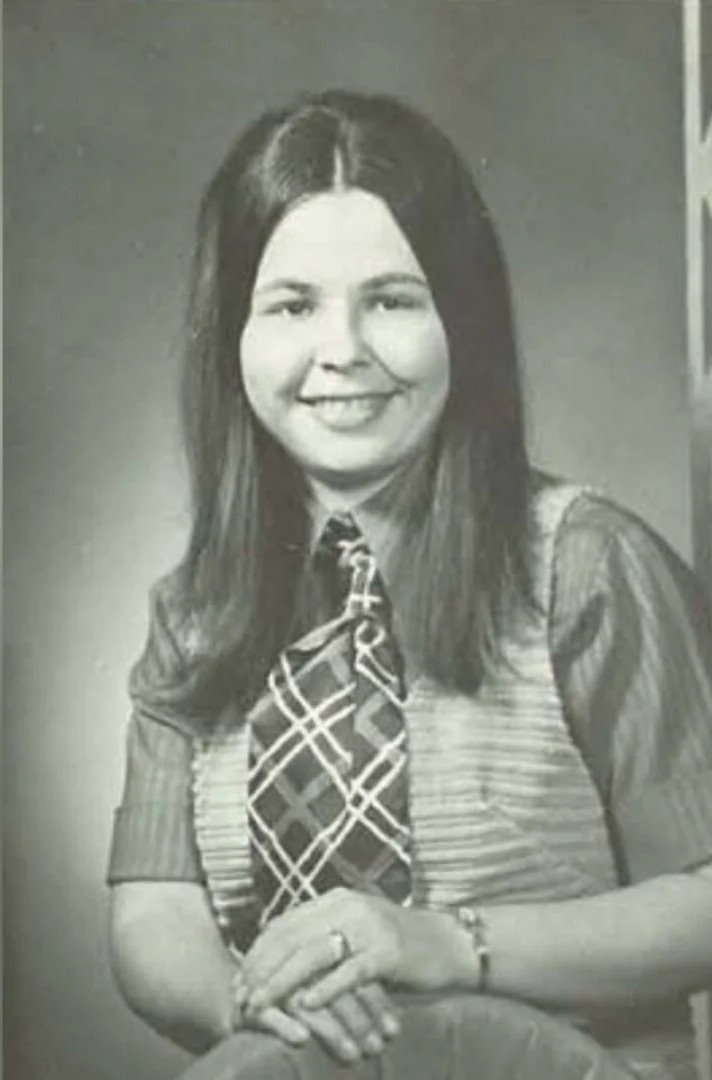
- Jeschke in 1971
- Location: St. Joseph, Missouri, U.S.
- Date: November 12, 1980; 45 years ago (CST)
- Target: Patricia Jeschke
- Attack type: Murder via strangulation
- Deaths: 1 (Patricia Jeschke)
- Accused: Michael Holman
- Convicted: Sandra Lynne Hemme (overturned)

Patricia Jeschke was an American woman murdered in St. Joseph, Missouri, on November 12, 1980. An investigation managed by Lloyd Pasley led to the arrest of Joseph Wabski and Sandra Hemme for the murder; Hemme was convicted for Jeschke's murder in 1981, while the charges against Wabski were dropped. However, Hemme recanted her confession and a new trial was held in 1985, which found her guilty. Hemme claimed to have knowledge about the disappearance of Micki Jo West.

Hemme's guilt was debated and Michael Holman, a St. Joseph police officer, is accused of having committed the murder, including by Pasley. An 118-page memorandum by Judge Ryan Horsman in 2024 ruled that the evidence in the case linked Holman to the crime, and Hemme was released that year. Hemme has the longest prison tenure for a wrongfully convicted American woman.

== Murder ==
Patricia Jeschke, age 31, did not come to her secretarial job at the St. Joseph, Missouri library. Library director Dorothy Elliott went to Jeschke's one-story duplex home after unsuccessfully trying to call her. She was unable to enter the house due to it being locked and called Jeschke's mother, Helen F. McGlothlin. McGlothlin broke a window to enter the house and discovered Jeschke dead with a laceration in the back of her head and a telephone cord around her neck at 1 p.m. on November 13, 1980. James Robert Hayes, a police chief, stated that there were no signs of forced entry. Jeschke was last previously seen alive around 5 p.m. on November 12, 1980. Jeschke, who was naked and who had been sexually molested, was killed via strangulation and suffered multiple head wounds. She had been dead for twelve to sixteen hours before her body was discovered.

== Investigation ==
Lloyd Pasley was placed in charge of the investigation and a $1,000 reward was offered by her parents. A journalist incorrectly published a bulletin stating that a 24-year-old man was charged with Jeschke's murder after hearing half of a conversation between a captain and lieutenant. The police investigated over 200 leads. It was theorized that Jeschke's murder was connected to the murders of Roger Atkinson and Rose Bukert in Iowa, but police in the state found no connection.

Sandra Lynne Hemme and Joseph Patrick Wabski were arrested on December 5. Wabski was charged with murder and Hemme was charged with a Class D felony of concealing knowledge of the crime. Hemme was also charged with a Class D felony assault for attempting to use a knife against a police officer in an unrelated case on November 25. Hemme, a former patient at the St. Joseph State Hospital, stated that she was "just bumming around" as her parents lived in Concordia, Missouri. Hemme attempted suicide at age 13 and was hospitalized in mental institutions for six of the next eight years in Kansas City, St. Louis, Jefferson City, Columbia, and in Maryland. She attempted suicide three to four more times. Wabski was identified as the killer by Hemme. Wabski stated that he did not know Hemme.

Hemme confessed to the murder during the eighth police interrogation. Hemme's initial story to detectives did not mention murder and was instead about her hitchhiking with two people, named Joe and Pat. However, the next day she stated that the man's full name was Joe Wabski. They went to a house with Pat and he came out with blood on his hands stating that "I killed that fucking bitch" after talking about "human and animal sacrifices" and threatened to kill Hemme if she told anybody. Hemme was able to lead police to Jeschke's house, but her lawyers later stated that police drove her there. She later stated that she witnessed the murder and attempted to stop Wabski from killing Jeschke. Police showed Hemme pictures of the crime scene.

Wabski had been in prison multiple times since 1958, including for the assault of two officers in September 1977, and was living at a halfway house. However, the murder charge against him was dropped after three witnesses and business records in Topeka, Kansas, confirmed his alibi. Wabski considered suing the police for damages due to the false accusations of murder. Hemme was charged with murder on December 10, and denied bail while her assault charge was later dropped.

== Court history ==
=== First trial ===
Hemme was initially scheduled preliminary hearing on December 18, but a grand jury indictment on December 15 resulted in her being arraigned by the Circuit Court Division III instead. This resulted in evidence not being shown publicly until the beginning of the trial. Her lawyer, Dale Sullivan, requested a mental examination for her.

Hemme initially pled not guilty, but later pled guilty on April 10, 1981. Judge Fred E. Schoenlaub initially did not accept her guilty plea as it was too vague with her not remembering "how she had gotten there" and ordered that the case go to trial, but accepted it minutes later. Schoenlaub sentenced her to life imprisonment without parole for 50 years. At the trial, Hemme recounted what happened the night of the murder, saying that she had "lost control" and that she had been "pretty well intoxicated". She claimed to have first met Jeschke at Platt College. Jeschke picked her up while hitchhiking to Kansas City and Hemme asked if she could get a shower at Jeschke house. Hemme claimed that they argued over money that Jeschke owed her due to a drug deal. During her guilty plea, Hemme stated that the prosecution "promised that if I plead guilty he will not ask for the death penalty". Hemme stated that she used a hunting knife to kill Jeschke before throwing it away at a battlefield park in Lexington, Missouri, and threw Jeschke's purse away near Interstate 70, but police were unable to find either item. Jeschke's father, Earl McGlothlin, criticized Hemme's claim that she killed Jeschke due to a disagreement over a drug deal and that his daughter "neither used nor sold drugs".

=== Second trial ===
Hemme was questioned about the disappearance of Micki Jo West the day after pleading guilty. Hemme claimed that a cult buried the body of West near St. Joseph. She claimed that West was a member of the cult and that her body was cut open and had her organs removed. No evidence of the crime was ever discovered despite thirteen officers searching the area. West's disappearance was later featured on Unsolved Mysteries in 1988.

Hemme later recanted her confession and filed a motion on November 12, 1982, to have her guilty plea withdrawn and sentence vacated. She claimed that she waived her constitutional rights without fully understanding them and that her counsel was ineffective. Hemme stated that she was told by the prosecution to mention the phone cord as it would show that the murder was premeditated and Sullivan said it "sounded more believable". She stated that she was not aware that she could request a mental examination or a change of venue and that she would not have pled guilty if she had known. She also claimed that Sullivan told her she would serve only nine to thirteen years in prison while the fifty years before parole was "just to impress the family".

The Buchanan County Circuit Court rejected her motion in 1983, but the Missouri Court of Appeals overturned her conviction in 1984, stating that she should have been allowed to reverse her initial guilty plea. Hemme was found guilty on June 5, 1985, after three and a-half hours of deliberation. The trial was one day long and featured no evidence besides Hemme's confession. The prosecution altered Hemme's motive from a financial dispute to having an uncontrollable urge to harm people. Three weeks later Hemme filed a motion for a new trial, but it was denied.

Exculpatory evidence, such as a FBI report that eliminated any connection between Hemme and the crime scene, was hidden from the defense. Other evidence about Michael Holman's connection to the case was also not shared.

=== Release and exoneration ===
An evidentiary hearing for Hemme was scheduled for January 16, 2024. The hearing was held over the course of three days. During the hearing Steven Fueston, a former detective, stated that he stopped one of the police interviews of Hemme because "she didn't seem totally coherent".

On June 14, 2024, Judge Ryan Horsman, in an 118-page memorandum, ruled that the evidence directly tied Holman to the murder while no forensic evidence, witnesses, or motive existed to implicate Hemme. He also stated that Hemme's counsel was ineffective. Prosecutors in Buchanan County were given thirty days to either give her a retrial or dismiss the charges. Buchanan County Prosecutor Michelle Davidson did not file any charges. The attorney general appealed the decision to the Missouri Court of Appeals, but the court maintained Horsman's decision in October. Hemme was official exonerated in December; as of 2025, 56 people, including Hemme, have been exonerated in Missouri since 1991.

Hemme's wrongful conviction produced the longest ever prison tenure for an exonerated American woman. Hemme, now a grandmother, was released from Chillicothe Correctional Center at 5:50 p.m. on July 19, and will live with her sister. Upon Hemme's release from prison she visited her father in a hospital; he died ten days later.

Hemme's lawyer stated that she will need help due to her long prison tenure and being ineligible for Social Security. She is eligible for $176 per day that she was wrongfully incarcerated, but would have to give up her right to sue the state for damages.

== Michael Holman ==
During Hemme's prosecution Sullivan was informed by two journalists from the St. Joseph Gazette and St. Joseph News-Press of a possible police coverup with police hiding evidence from the defense. He was informed of a possible suspect affiliated with the St. Joseph Police Department. The reporter told him that the man was seen in the vicinity of Jeschke's house and later used Jeschke's credit cards to purchase a camera in Kansas City the day after she was discovered. Pubic hair samples were taken from Jeschke's body and the man who used the credit cards. Michael Insco, the prosecuting attorney for Buchanan County, Missouri, stated that "we do not expect to file any charges against anyone else in the Jeschke case". Police denied the allegations and stated that no FBI report existed and that the man took the credit card from Jeschke's purse after finding it near a cabin he rented. However, a FBI report did exist and Sullivan sought a copy of it, but the allegations and the actual report "varied substantially".

The police officer, Holman, was brought up during Hemme's 1985 trial. Holman quit his job as an officer a week after Jeschke's death. Holman attempted to purchase $630.43 of photography equipment. Hairs from Holman and Jeschke's bed sheets had similar "microscopic characteristics." Holman claimed that he had sex with a woman named Mary in a motel near Jeschke's house and that he found a purse with the credit card while walking back to his truck. He altered the name on the credit card from Patricia to Patrick. The woman could not be contacted to verify his alibi and Holman refused to draw a diagram of the motel's interior. His alibi was not proven and the motel manager did not remember somebody named Mary staying there at the time. Holman was later incarcerated in Missouri and Nebraska and died in 2015. The hair in Jeschke's bed sheets, which was from a Black man, was alleged to be from Vernon Burris, the only Black officer who came to the crime scene, but the FBI reported that it did not match Burris' hair. This information is relevant as Holman was also Black.

=== Statements on Holman's possible involvement ===
The Innocence Project was contacted by Hemme in 2006. In February 2023, the Innocence Project filed a petition to release Hemme from prison stating that she falsely confessed to the crime and that Holman committed the murder. Jeschke's earring was also found at Holman's house and that information was hidden from the defense. Larry Harman, who worked as Hemme's lawyer, stated that Hemme's "mentally fragile state" was taken advantage of. Bobby Cummings wrote to Hemme during her time in prison and stated that he was the one who picked her up while hitchhiking, but his letter was not mentioned during her trial.

Pasley believes that Hemme is innocent and that Holman was the murderer. During an insurance fraud investigation Holman claimed that his service weapon was stolen, but it was found in a storage unit he used. Pasley theorized that the gun was used to beat Jeschke, but the gun was sent for cleaning and returned to service before he could test it.

Judge Patrick Robb, at the time an assistant prosecuting attorney in Buchanan County while Hemme was on trial in 1985, stated that he knew Holman "was connected to the case" and talked about it with Hemme's lawyer Robert Duncan. Robb stated that he did not trust Hayes, whose tenure as police chief saw Melvin Lee Reynolds falsely confess to murder.
