= Morris Frederick Bell =

American architect (1849–1929)

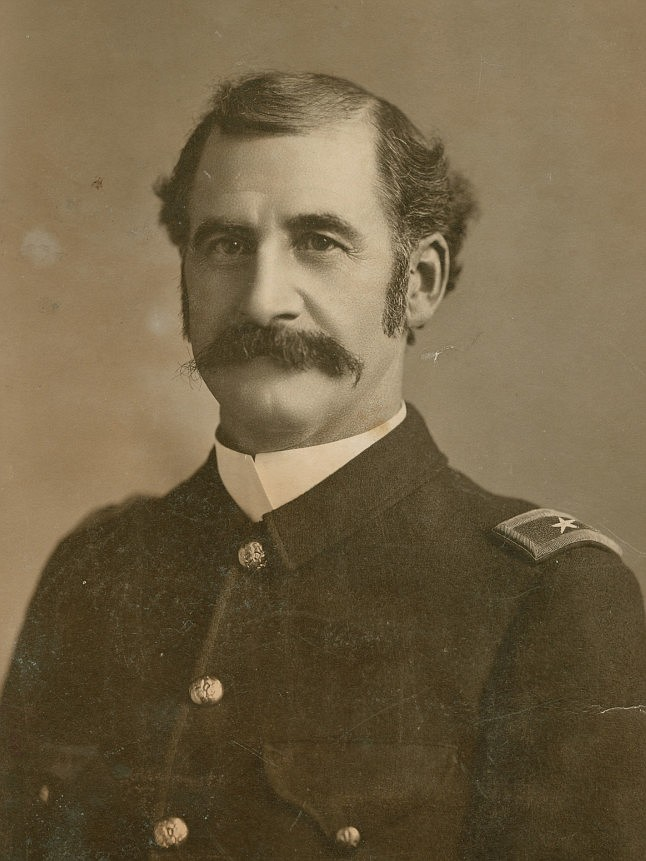
- Born: August 18, 1849; Hagerstown, Maryland, US
- Died: August 2, 1929 (aged 80); Fulton, Missouri, US
- Education: Duff's College
- Occupation: Architect
- Buildings: Jesse Hall, Brandon-Bell-Collier House
- Projects: David R. Francis Quadrangle

Morris Frederick Bell (August 8, 1849 – August 2, 1929) was an American architect known primarily for his institutional buildings but also for his domestic and commercial structures. His best known work is the David R. Francis Quadrangle the historic center of the University of Missouri including Jesse Hall. He also designed state correctional schools in Boonville, Chillicothe, and Tipton; and state mental hospitals in Fulton, Higginsville, and Nevada. Bell, a democrat, was also active in civic life, especially Masonic organizations. He trained and employed William Lincoln Garver as an assistant. Garver would later go on to have a stand-alone career.

== Notable works ==
- Jesse Hall the main building of the University of Missouri, listed as part of the Francis Quadrangle Historic District on the National Register of Historic Places
- M. Fred Bell Rental Cottage in Fulton, Missouri, listed on the National Register of Historic Places
- M. Fred Bell Speculative Cottage in Fulton, Missouri, listed on the National Register of Historic Places
- Brandon-Bell-Collier House in Fulton, Missouri, listed on the National Register of Historic Places
- Chillicothe Industrial Home for Girls in Chillicothe, Missouri, listed on the National Register of Historic Places
- Court Street Historic Residential District in Fulton, Missouri, listed on the National Register of Historic Places
- Downtown Fulton Historic District in Fulton, Missouri, listed on the National Register of Historic Places
- Missouri State Penitentiary Warden's House in Jefferson City, Missouri, listed on the National Register of Historic Places

== See also ==
- National Register of Historic Places listings in Boone County, Missouri

== Sources ==
- Ohman, Marian M. Initial Study of Architect M.F. Bell, 1849–1929, His Contributions to the State of Missouri. Columbia: University of Missouri, 1970.
- Christensen, Lawrence O., William E. Foley, Gary R. Kremer, and Kenneth H. Winn, eds. Dictionary of Missouri Biography. Columbia: University of Missouri Press, 1999. pp. 55–56
- "General Bell Left His Imprint on Missouri." Fulton Sun-Gazette. April 27, 1980. p. 12.
