= Downtown Fulton Historic District =

Historic district in Missouri, United States

- U.S. National Register of Historic Places
- U.S. Historic district
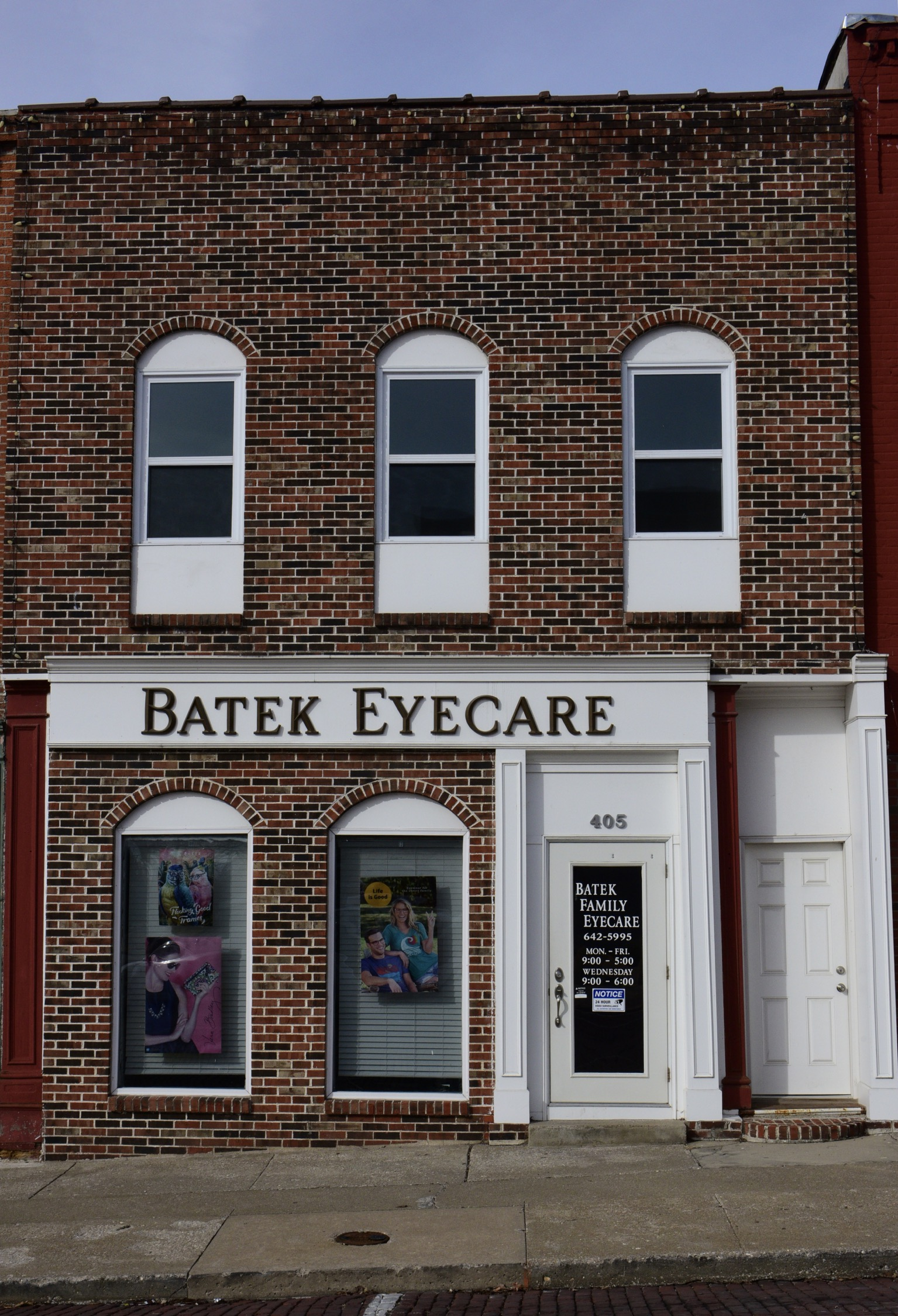
- Willing & Dorsey General Store

- Location within Missouri Location within the United States
- Location: Roughly bounded by 4th St., Market, 7th St. and Jefferson Ave., Fulton, Missouri
- Coordinates: 38°50′55″N 91°56′56″W
- Area: 11.5 acres (4.7 ha)
- Architect: Bell, M. Fred
- Architectural style: Italianate, Late 19th And 20th Century Revivals
- NRHP reference No.: 04000668
- Added to NRHP: July 7, 2004

Downtown Fulton Historic District is a national historic district located at Fulton, Callaway County, Missouri. It encompasses 57 contributing buildings and 1 contributing structure in the central business district of Fulton. It developed between about 1877 and 1954, and includes representative examples of Italianate, Second Empire, Colonial Revival, and Classical Revival style architecture. Some of the buildings were designed by noted local architect Morris Frederick Bell. Notable buildings include the Southern Bank of Fulton (c. 1905), Masonic Lodge (1872), Home Savings Bank (c. 1884), Montgomery-Bell Dry Goods (c. 1902), Humphreys-Atkinson-Reid Furniture Company (c. 1888), Fulton Cinema (1926), Kingdom Oil Company (1937), First Christian Church (1911), Adams Building (1890), and U.S. Post Office (1915).

It was listed on the National Register of Historic Places in 2004.
