= Research Cave =

Cave in Missouri, U.S.

Coordinates: 38°44′4.7″N 91°44′32.2″W

- U.S. National Register of Historic Places
- U.S. National Historic Landmark
- Location within Missouri Location within the United States
- Nearest city: Portland, Missouri
- NRHP reference No.: 66000415

Significant dates
- Added to NRHP: October 15, 1966
- Designated NHL: July 19, 1964

Research Cave, also known as the Arnold Research Cave and the Saltpetre Cave, and designated by the Smithsonian trinomial 23CY64, is a major Native American archaeological site near Portland, Missouri. Investigation of the site has uncovered evidence of human habitation as far back as 8,000 years. The site was designated a National Historic Landmark in 1964; it has been recommended for de-designation due to looting.

== Description ==
The cave is located in an outcrop of sandstone approximately 2 miles (3.2 km) north of Portland, overlooking the Missouri River. The cave is substantially more than a rock shelter, with interior chambers accessible by low passages. When white settlers moved to the area in the early 19th century, one of them, John Phillips, began mining saltpetre from the cave for the manufacture of gunpowder. A later long-term owner was H.A. Arnold, giving the cave the name by which it is most commonly known. It has been the subject of archaeological interest since the mid-1950s, with intermixed materials that date back an estimate seven to ten thousand years. Finds at the cave are particularly notable for fine examples of footwear. The cave has produced several of North America's oldest human clothing finds including a pair of leather wrapped moccasins dating back 5,500 years ago. The site has been repeatedly disturbed, both by burrowing animals, and previously laid layers of cultural materials have been disturbed by subsequent occupants of the cave. By the early 1980s alterations to deposits at the cave mouth by the property owner had compromised some of the materials.

== See also ==
- List of National Historic Landmarks in Missouri
- National Register of Historic Places listings in Callaway County, Missouri
