= George Washington Carver School (Fulton, Missouri) =

- U.S. National Register of Historic Places
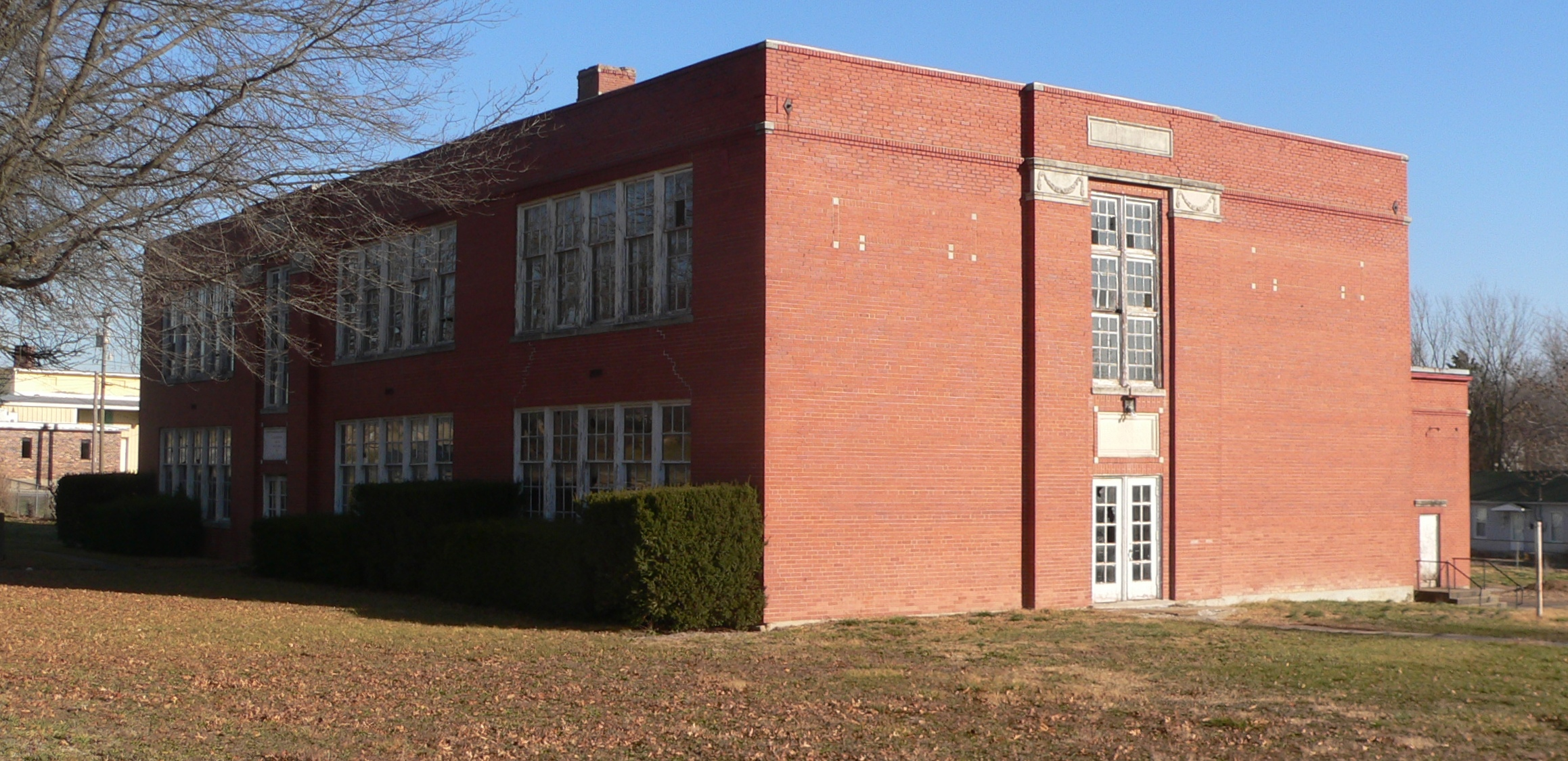
- G. W. Carver School, December 2012

- Location within Missouri Location within the United States
- Location: 909 Westminster, Fulton, Missouri
- Coordinates: 38°51′14″N 91°57′12″W
- Area: 1.7 acres (0.69 ha)
- Built: 1937
- Architect: Felt, Dunham, & Kriehn
- NRHP reference No.: 96001381
- Added to NRHP: December 2, 1996

George Washington Carver School, also known as North School, is a historic school building located at Fulton, Callaway County, Missouri. It was built in 1937, and is a two-story, T-shaped, brick building with a partial basement. The building housed Fulton's only African-American school for 37 years. The school was closed in 1982.

The school was listed on the National Register of Historic Places in 1996.

== Future renovation plans ==
The Board of Directors of the George Washington Carver Cultural Center entered into an option contract during the first of January 2019 with MACO Management Company to restore the building and convert it into affordable housing for senior citizens.
