= Chillicothe Industrial Home for Girls =

- U.S. National Register of Historic Places
- U.S. Historic district
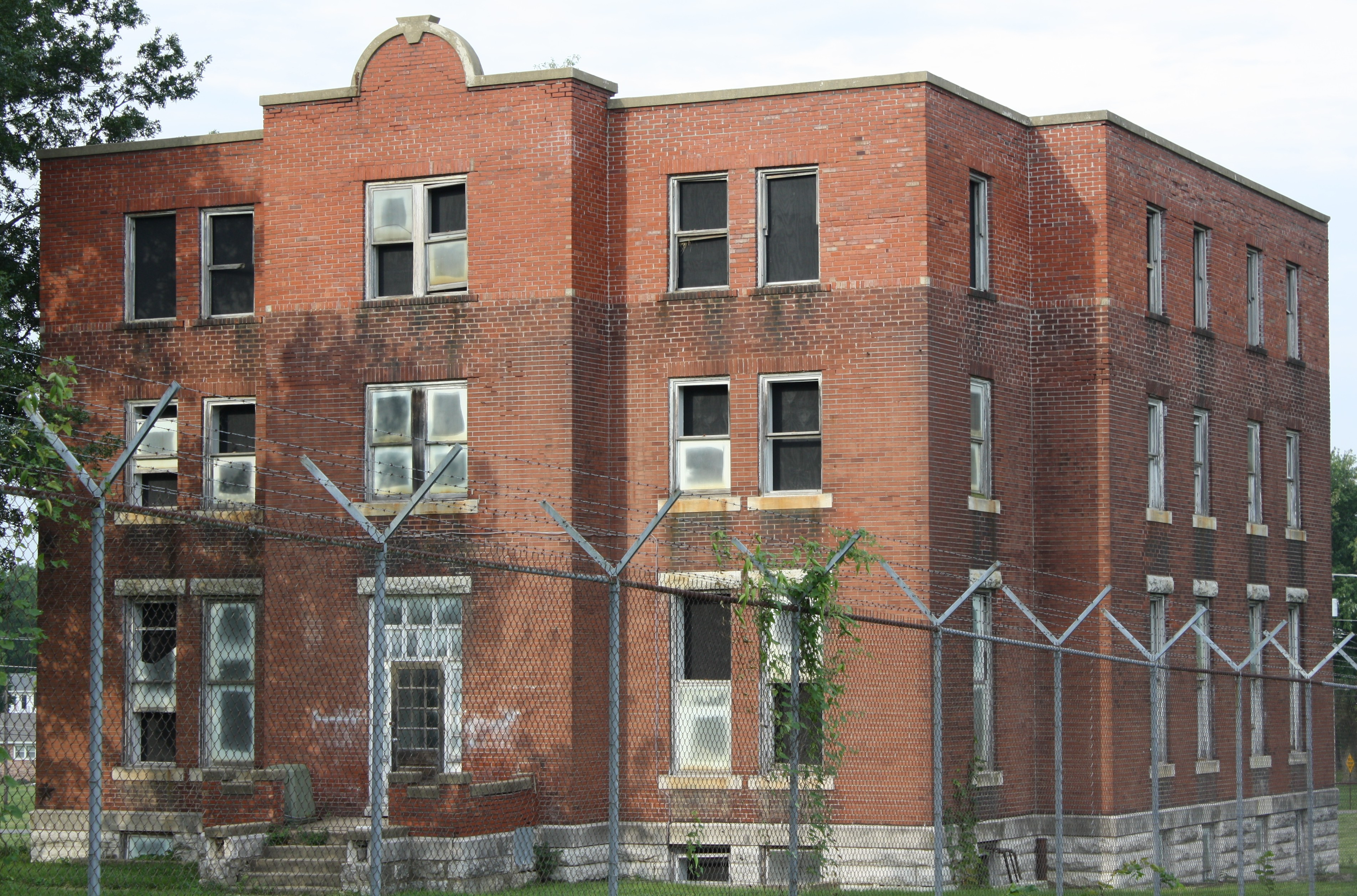
- Chillicothe Industrial Home for Girls, September 2014

- Location within Missouri Location within the United States
- Location: 1500 Third St., Chillicothe, Missouri
- Coordinates: 39°47′22″N 93°33′45″W
- Area: 46 acres (19 ha)
- Built: 1888
- Architect: Bell, M. Fred
- Architectural style: Colonial Revival, Moderne
- NRHP reference No.: 10000182
- Added to NRHP: April 19, 2010

Chillicothe Industrial Home for Girls, also known as Chillicothe Correctional Center, is a national historic district located at Chillicothe, Livingston County, Missouri. The district encompasses 10 contributing buildings, 1 contributing site, and 7 contributing structures, at a former industrial home. It developed between about 1889 and 1970, and includes representative examples of Colonial Revival and Streamline Moderne style architecture. Notable buildings include the McReynolds Cottage (188-1889) by Morris Frederick Bell, who also designed the original campus; Blair Cottage (1957-1958); Hearnes Office Building and Clinic (1967-1968); Donnelly Cottage (1957-1958); Stark Cottage (1937-1938); Hyde School (1922); Park Cottage (1937-1938); Food Service Building (1957-1958); Laundry (c. 1920); Power House (c. 1888–1889, c. 1957–1958). The home officially closed as a juvenile facility in 1980 and re-opened as an adult correctional center in 1981. The new Chillicothe Correctional Center opened in 2008, and the former Industrial Home site was declared surplus.

It was listed on the National Register of Historic Places in 2010.
