= Chillicothe Correctional Center =

Prison in Missouri, United States

Coordinates: 39°49′56″N 93°32′21″W

- Interactive map of Chillicothe Correctional Center
- Location: 3151 Litton Road Chillicothe, Missouri
- Status: open
- Security class: (Minimum, Medium, Maximum)
- Capacity: 1740
- Opened: 2008
- Managed by: Missouri Department of Corrections
- Director: Chris McBee

see also the Chillicothe Correctional Institution, Ohio

The Chillicothe Correctional Center is a state prison for women in Chillicothe, Livingston County, Missouri, owned and operated by the Missouri Department of Corrections. The $120 million facility opened in late 2008, and with a capacity of 1740 inmates at a mix of security levels.

The previous prison, in downtown Chillicothe at 1500 Third Street, had been established in 1888 as the Chillicothe Industrial Home for Girls.

During the COVID-19 pandemic, the prison reported 252 positive cases among inmates and 27 among staff.

== Notable inmates ==
- Alyssa Dailene Bustamante - Perpetrator of the 2009 murder of Elizabeth Olten, her 9-year-old neighbor; serving a life sentence.
- Sandra Hemme - Wrongfully convicted for the murder of Patricia Jeschke
- Pam Hupp - Convicted of murdering Louis Gumpenberger, a special needs individual; serving a life sentence without parole.
- Gypsy-Rose Blanchard - Pled guilty to 2nd degree murder and sentenced to 10 years in 2016 for the 2015 stabbing death of her mother, Dee Dee, who for years forced her to pretend she had serious health problems; subject of the HBO documentary Mommy Dead and Dearest and The Act. Released on December 28, 2023.
- Diane Staudte, main perpetrator of the Staudte family murders
