= Brandon-Bell-Collier House =

Historic house in Missouri, United States

- U.S. National Register of Historic Places
- U.S. Historic district – Contributing property
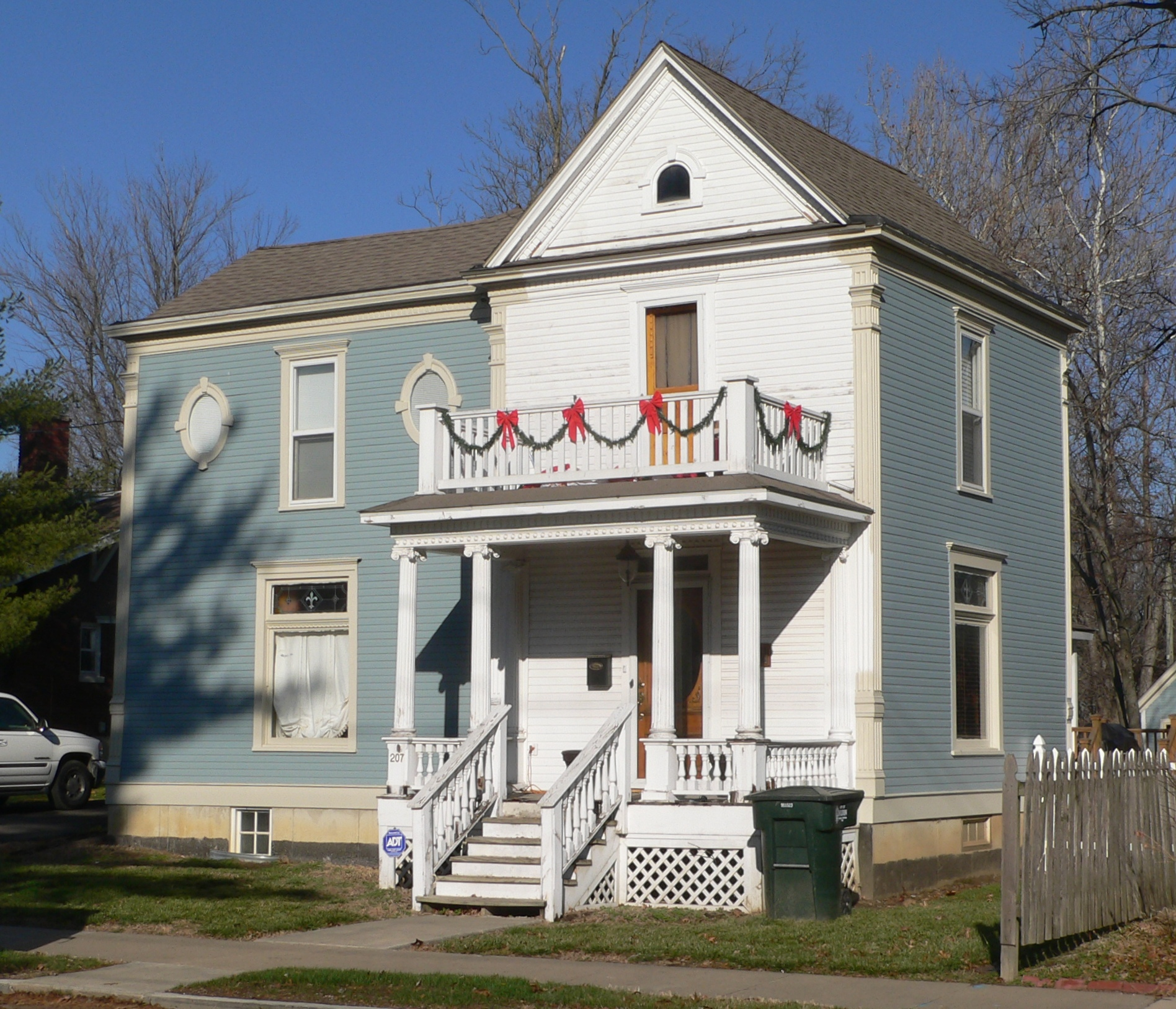
- View from the southeast

- Location within Missouri Location within the United States
- Location: 207 E. Ninth St., Fulton, Missouri
- Coordinates: 38°51′16.92″N 91°56′41.71″W
- Built: 1901
- Architect: Morris Frederick Bell
- Architectural style: Queen Anne
- NRHP reference No.: 98001545
- Added to NRHP: December 24, 1998

The Brandon-Bell-Collier House is a house in Fulton, Callaway County, Missouri, in the state of Missouri in the central United States. It was built in stages between about 1862 and 1917. From 1900 to 1902, it was owned by Fulton architect Morris Frederick Bell, who undertook a major remodelling, expanding the house to two stories and incorporating elements of the Queen Anne and Colonial Revival architectural styles.

The house was listed on the National Register of Historic Places in 1998. It is located in the Court Street Historic Residential District.
