= M. Fred Bell Rental Cottage =

Historic house in Missouri, United States

- U.S. National Register of Historic Places
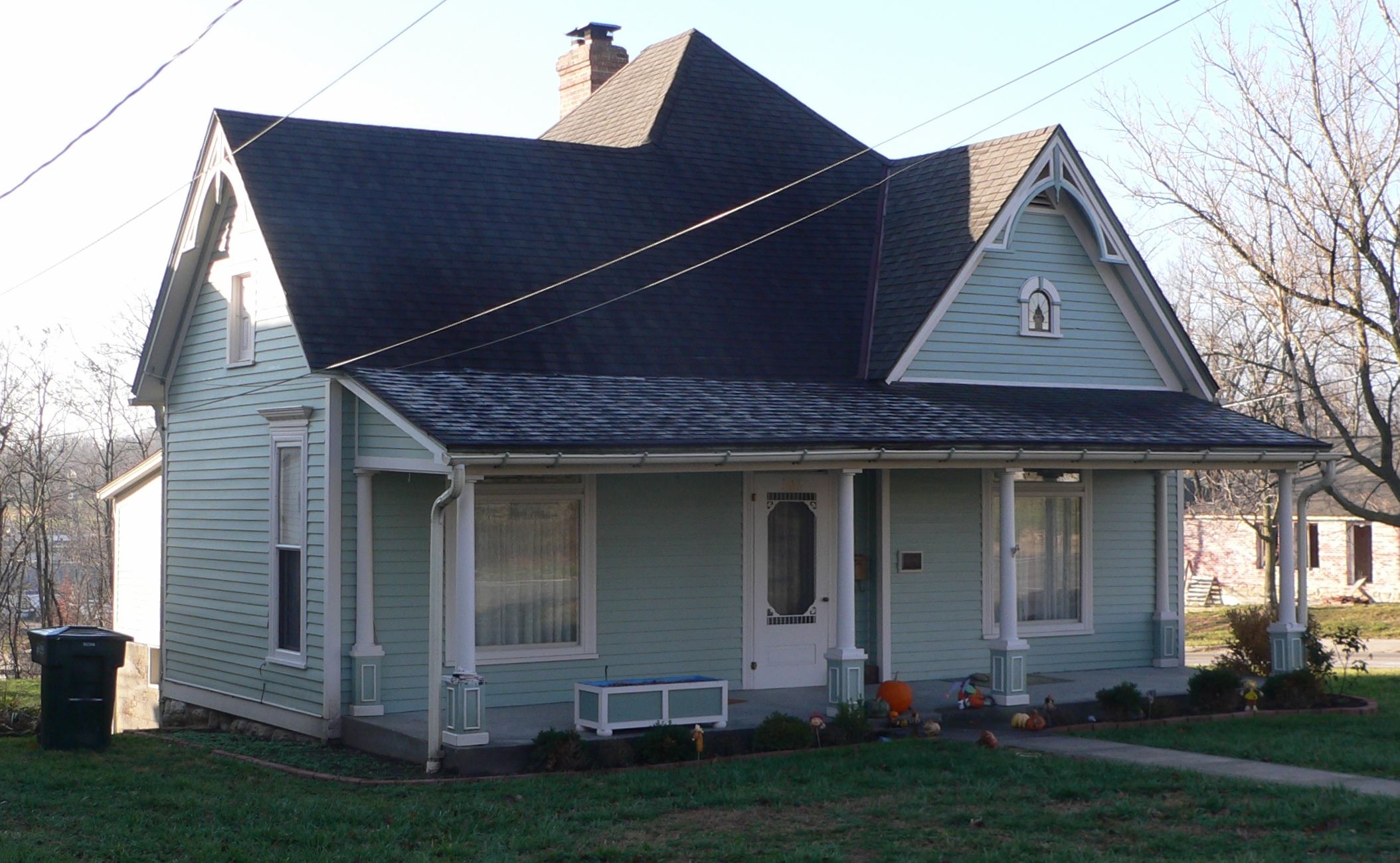
- M. Fred Bell Rental Cottage, December 2012

- Location within Missouri Location within the United States
- Location: 302 E. Fifth St., Fulton, Missouri
- Coordinates: 38°50′49″N 91°56′38″W
- Area: less than one acre
- Built: 1893-1894, c. 1904
- Architect: Bell, Fred M.
- Architectural style: Shingle Style
- NRHP reference No.: 97000627
- Added to NRHP: July 10, 1997

M. Fred Bell Rental Cottage is a historic home located at Fulton, Callaway County, Missouri. It was built between about 1893 and 1894, with additions designed by Fulton architect Morris Frederick Bell built about 1904. It is a one-story, Queen Anne / Shingle Style frame cottage with a central hip roof with pinwheel projecting gables. It was restored in the late-1990s.

The house was listed on the National Register of Historic Places in 1997.
