= John Augustus Hockaday House =

Historic house in Missouri, United States

- U.S. National Register of Historic Places
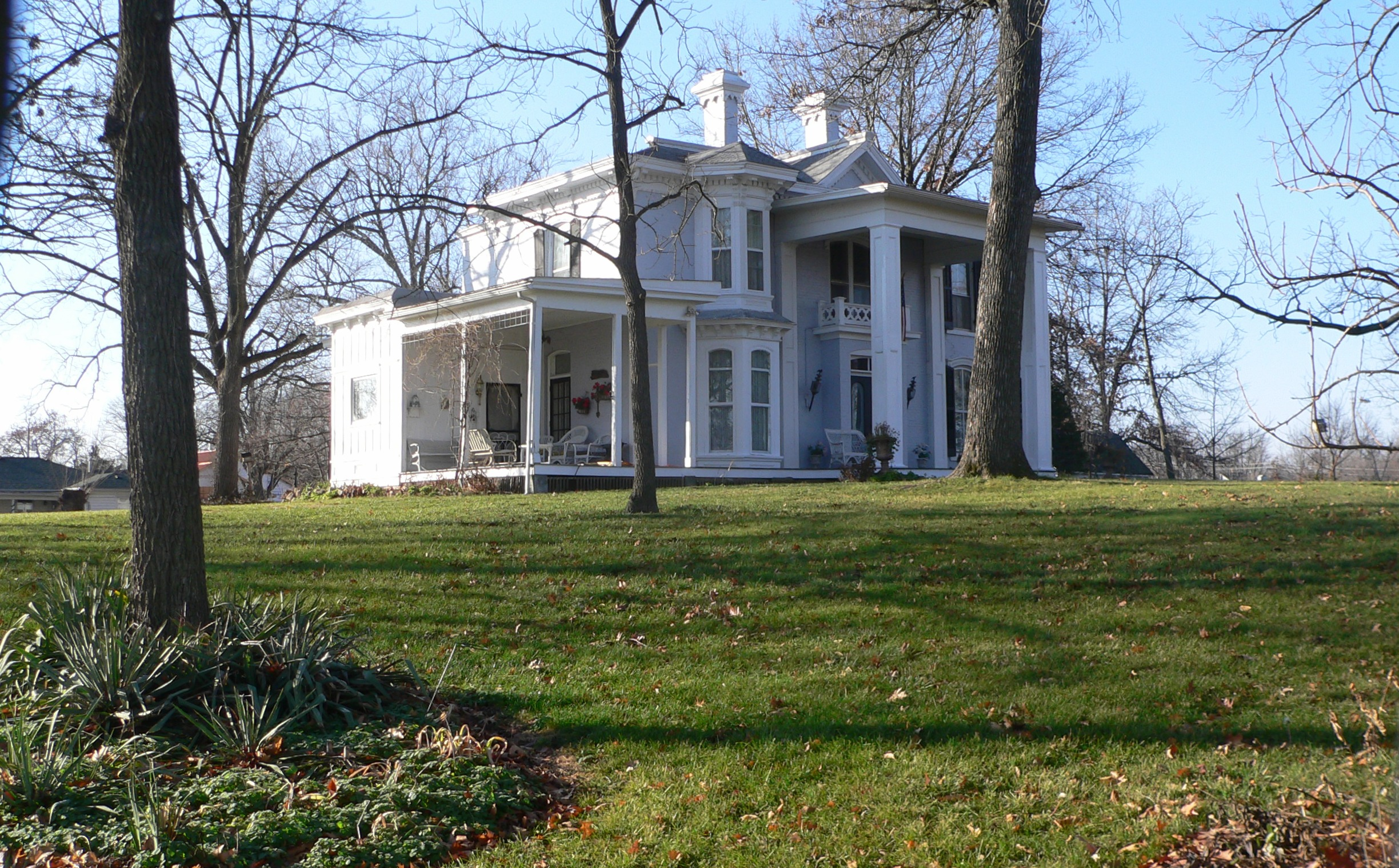
- Hockaday House, December 2012

- Location within Missouri Location within the United States
- Location: 105 Hockaday Ave., Fulton, Missouri
- Coordinates: 38°50′31″N 91°56′54″W
- Area: 0.3 acres (0.12 ha)
- Built: 1863-1868
- Built by: Hockaday, John A.
- Architectural style: Greek Revival, Italianate
- NRHP reference No.: 80002321
- Added to NRHP: September 17, 1980

John Augustus Hockaday House, also known as the Hockaday House, is a historic home located at Fulton, Callaway County, Missouri. It was built between 1863 and 1868, and is a two-story, vernacular Greek Revival / Italianate style brick I-house. It has a low hipped roof with denticulated cornice and features a two-story high portico with square piers and projecting bay.

The house was listed on the National Register of Historic Places in 1980.
