= White Cloud Presbyterian Church and Cemetery =

Historic site in Callaway County, Missouri, US

- U.S. National Register of Historic Places
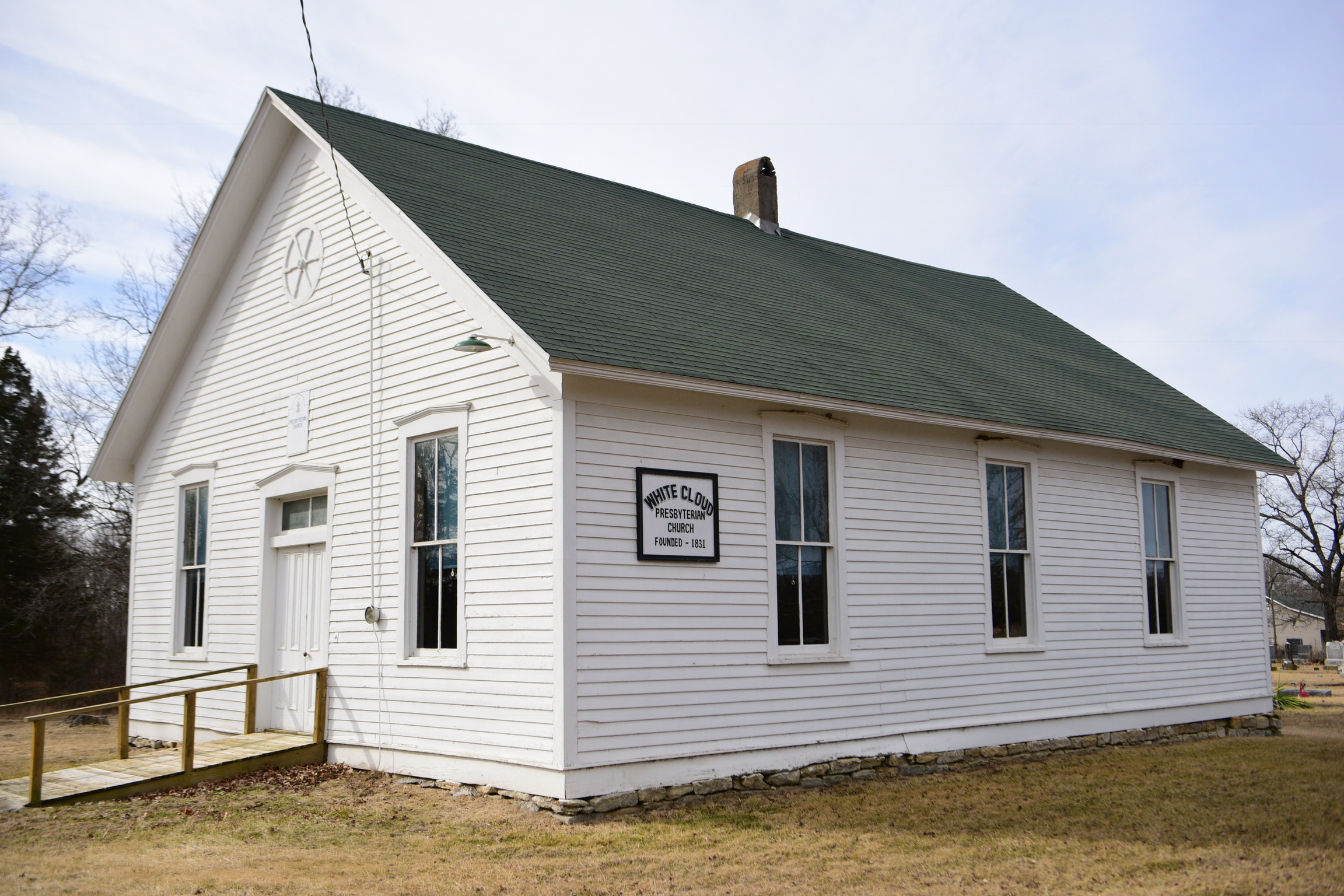

- Location within Missouri Location within the United States
- Location: South side of Missouri Route F at intersection with County Road 232, Fulton, Missouri
- Coordinates: 38°52′31″N 92°04′18″W
- Area: 3.44 acres (1.39 ha)
- Built: 1888
- Architectural style: Gable Front Church
- NRHP reference No.: 10000817
- Added to NRHP: October 12, 2010

White Cloud Presbyterian Church and Cemetery is a historic Presbyterian church and cemetery located at Fulton, Callaway County, Missouri. It was built in 1888, and is a one-story, frame gable front church on a limestone foundation. There are approximately 250 graves in the cemetery dating from about 1840 to the present.

It was listed on the National Register of Historic Places in 2010.
