= Westminster College Gymnasium =

- U.S. National Register of Historic Places
- U.S. National Historic Landmark
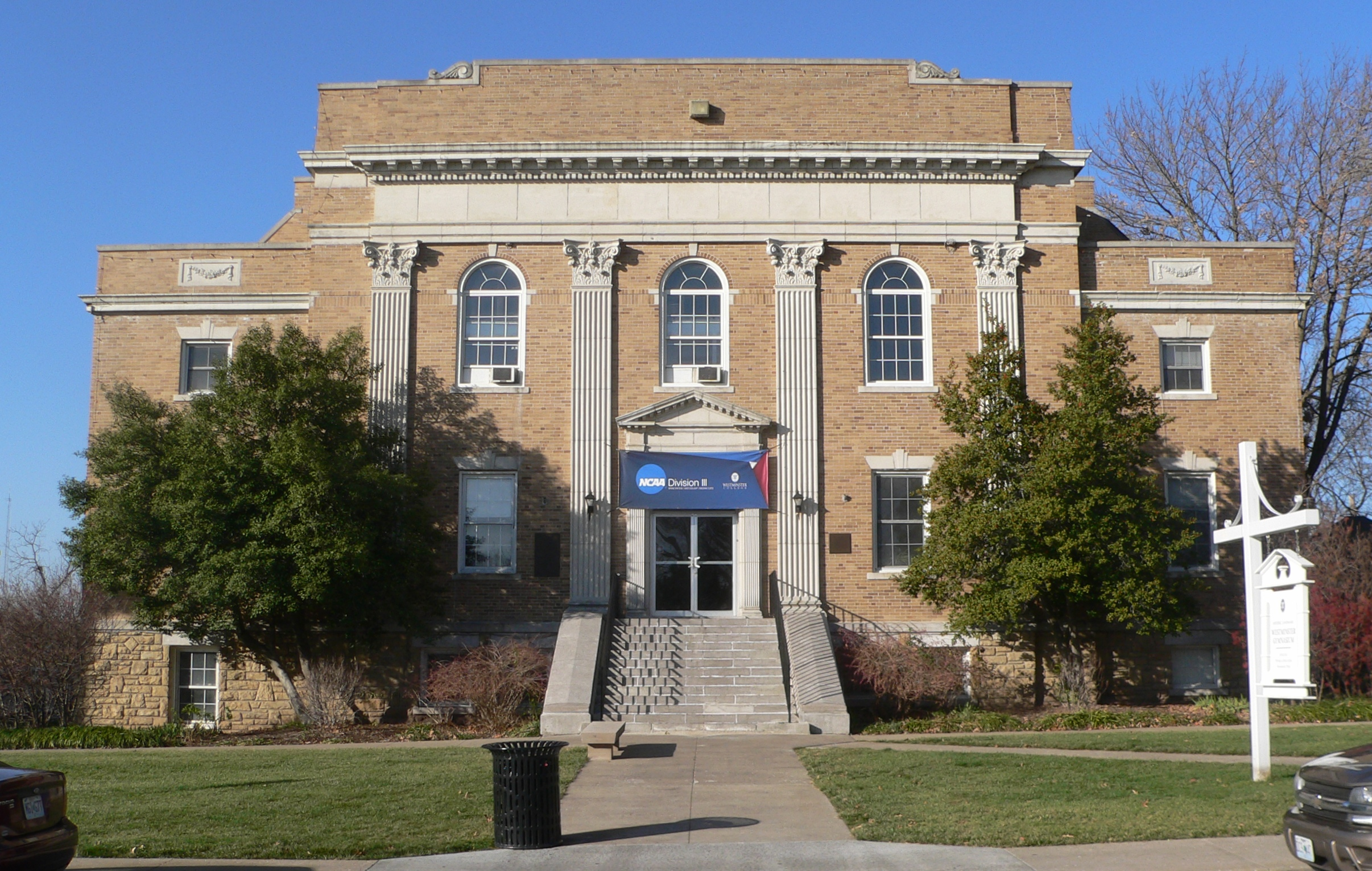
- View from the east

- Location within Missouri Location within the United States
- Location: Westminster College campus (CF Lampkin Dr.), Fulton, Missouri
- Coordinates: 38°50′54″N 91°57′22″W
- Area: less than one acre
- Built: 1929
- Architectural style: Classical Revival
- NRHP reference No.: 68000030

Significant dates
- Added to NRHP: May 23, 1968
- Designated NHL: May 2, 1968

Westminster College Gymnasium is a historic athletic building on the campus of Westminster College in Fulton, Missouri. The building is famous for being the site of Winston Churchill's March 5, 1946 "Sinews of Peace" speech, in which he coined the phrase "Iron Curtain" to characterize the growing Cold War. In 1968, the gymnasium was designated a National Historic Landmark.

== Description and history ==
The Westminster College Gymnasium stands prominently on the western edge of the greensward created by the CF Lampkin Drive, a loop road providing access to a portion of the college's campus. It is a two-story brick building, 80 by 155 feet (24 m × 47 m), with Classical Revival features. The front is five bays wide, with the center three projecting. The bays of the central portion are articulated by fluted Corinthian pilasters, and are topped by tall decorative parapet. Windows on the upper floor are set in round-arch windows, while those in the first floor are regular sash. The interior of the building is arranged with a central lobby flanked by office wings, and the gymnasium arena occupying most of the rear of the structure. The interior, in particular the gym space, has been relatively little altered since its construction, which was in 1928–29.

Westminster College decided to invite Winston Churchill to make a speech on its campus in 1946, during a planned trip. Churchill's agreement was secured through the work of Major General Harry Vaughan, a Westminster alumnus on the staff of United States President Harry S. Truman. Churchill agreed, and the speech he delivered on March 5, before a crowd of 2,000 in this gym, has since been immortalized for its dramatic description of the political climate in Europe. He stated that

From Stettin in the Baltic to Trieste in the Adriatic, an iron curtain has descended across the Continent.

The speech focused on the United Nations, nuclear proliferation and expansionist activities of the Soviet Union. Although the speech was initially not well received, it was one of the first high-profile expressions of the growing Cold War environment, and the "Iron Curtain" phrase eventually became a useful metaphor for the division of Europe during that period.

Westminster College maintains the National Churchill Museum at the reconstructed St Mary Aldermanbury nearby.

== See also ==
- List of National Historic Landmarks in Missouri
- National Register of Historic Places listings in Callaway County, Missouri
