= Ron McBride (running back) =

American football player (born 1948)

No. 24
- Position: Running back

Personal information
- Born: October 12, 1948 (age 78); Fulton, Missouri, U.S.
- Listed height: 6 ft 0 in (1.83 m)
- Listed weight: 202 lb (92 kg)

Career information
- College: Missouri
- NFL draft: 1970: undrafted

Career history
- Pittsburgh Steelers (1970)*; Green Bay Packers (1973)
- * Offseason or practice squad member only

Career NFL statistics
- Games played: 1
- Stats at Pro Football Reference

James Ronald McBride (born October 12, 1948) is an American former professional football player who was a running back for the Green Bay Packers of the National Football League (NFL). He played college football for the Missouri Tigers.

== Career ==
McBride played running back at the collegiate level at the University of Missouri from 1967 to 1969, appearing in 10 games each season. His college head coach was Dan Devine, who was later his coach with the Packers. He played in the 1968 Gator Bowl and the 1970 Orange Bowl. In his three college seasons, McBride gained 882 yards rushing, 251 yards receiving and 63 kick return yards. In his first season, 1967, he wore #26, and wore #32 in 1968 and 1969. His 1969 Missouri team—which also included future Packer Jon Staggers—had a 9–2 record and was named to the Missouri Sports Hall of Fame. McBride was the starting fullback for the West squad in the 1970 Coaches All-America Game in Lubbock, Texas.

McBride appeared in one game for the 1973 Packers, with whom he wore #24.
