= Court Street Historic Residential District =

Historic district in Missouri, United States

- U.S. National Register of Historic Places
- U.S. Historic district
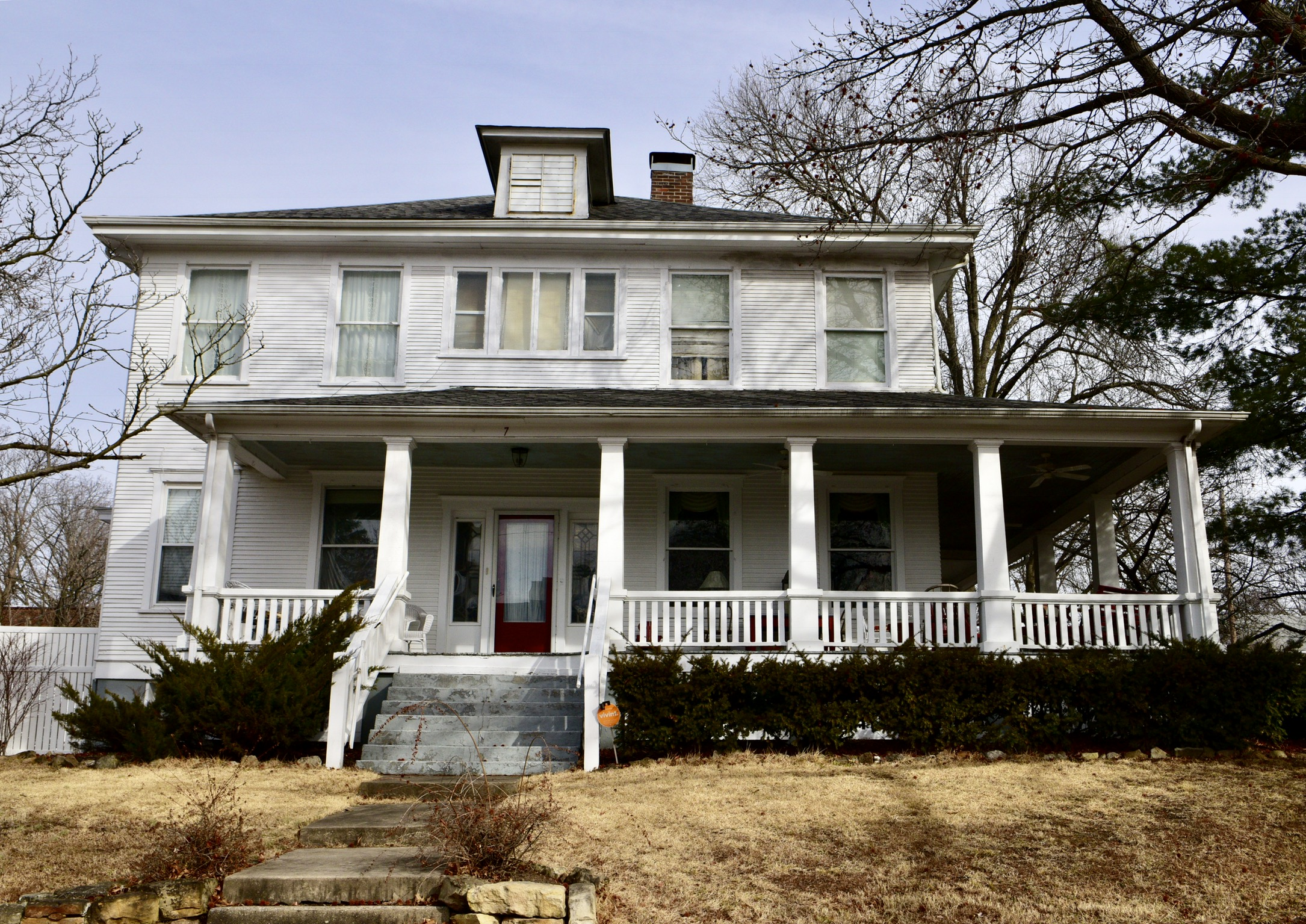
- John P. Newcomer House

- Location within Missouri Location within the United States
- Location: Roughly along Court bet. St. Louis and 10th Sts/, Fulton, Missouri
- Coordinates: 38°51′11″N 91°56′51″W
- Area: 27.5 acres (11.1 ha)
- Architect: Bell, M. Fred
- Architectural style: Late Victorian, Late 19th And 20th Century Revivals
- NRHP reference No.: 07000817
- Added to NRHP: August 15, 2007

Court Street Historic Residential District is a national historic district located at Fulton, Callaway County, Missouri. It encompasses 84 contributing buildings in a predominantly residential section of Fulton. It developed between about 1844 and 1945, and includes representative examples of Queen Anne, Second Empire, Colonial Revival, American Foursquare, and Bungalow style architecture. Some of the buildings were designed by noted local architect Morris Frederick Bell. Located in the district is the separately listed Brandon-Bell-Collier House. Other notable buildings include the John W. Tucker Residence (1912), Klinginsmith Residence (c. 1900), Synodical College-Seminole Apartments (c. 1900/1930), Synodical College Dormitory-Seminole Apartments (1913), Gish Residence (c. 1950), Dave and Ida McCue House (c. 1910), First Presbyterian Church (c. 1885), Leland Waters Residence (c. 1923), Bauer House (c. 1883), and Martin-Harris House (c. 1843, 1866).

It was listed on the National Register of Historic Places in 2007.
