= Pitcher Store =

- U.S. National Register of Historic Places
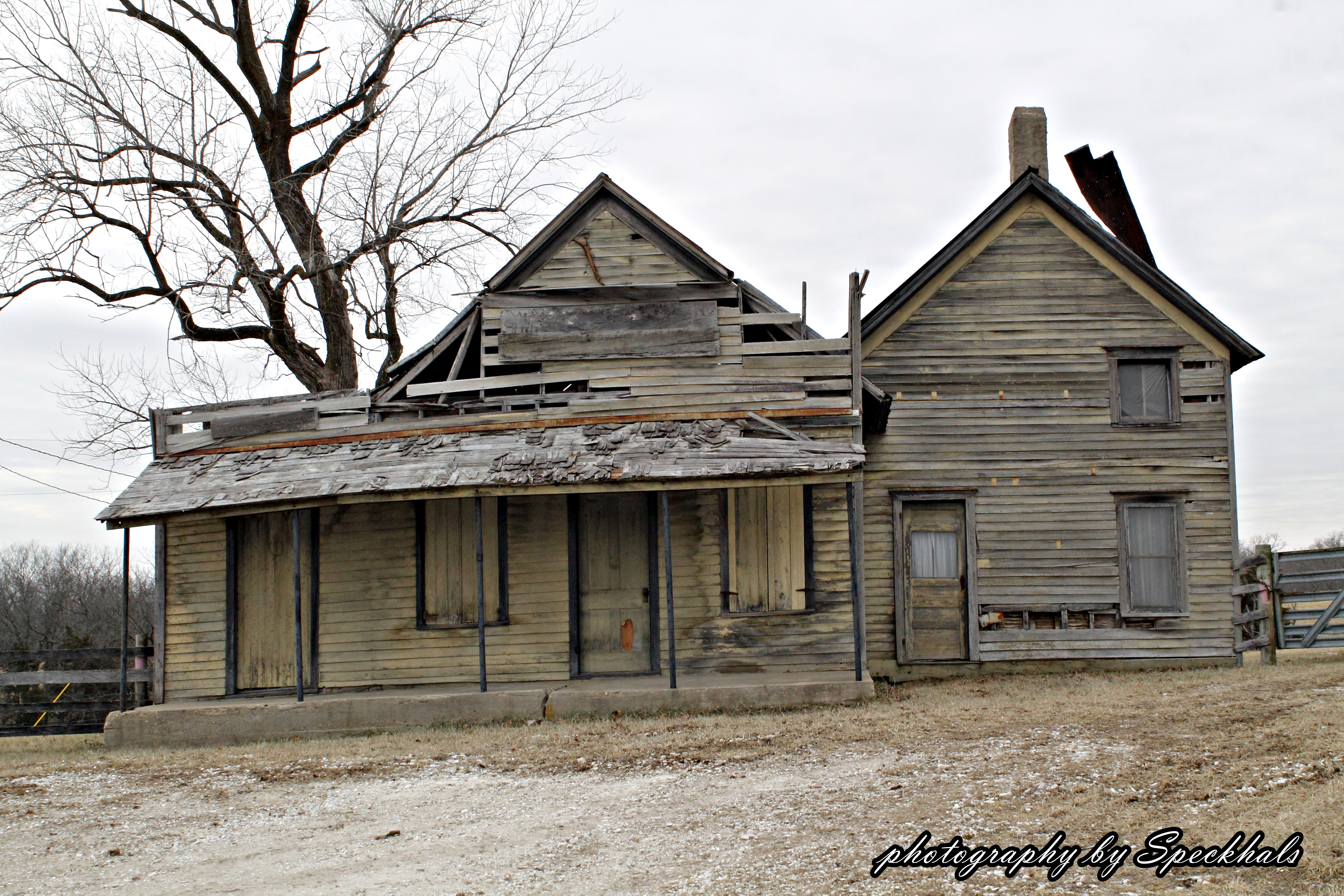
- Pitcher Store, January 2015

- Location within Missouri Location within the United States
- Location: 8513 Pitcher Rd., Fulton, Missouri
- Coordinates: 38°45′0″N 91°57′58″W
- Area: less than one acre
- Built: 1888, 1897, 1905
- Built by: Herring, Bob
- Architectural style: Log dwelling
- NRHP reference No.: 01000235
- Added to NRHP: March 12, 2001

Pitcher Store, also known as Craighead Store, is a historic commercial building located at Fulton, Callaway County, Missouri. It was built in three stages between 1888 and 1905. It is an irregular shaped, frame and log combination vernacular building served as a general store, post office and residence.

It was listed on the National Register of Historic Places in 2001.
