= M. Fred Bell Speculative Cottage =

Historic house in Missouri, United States

- U.S. National Register of Historic Places
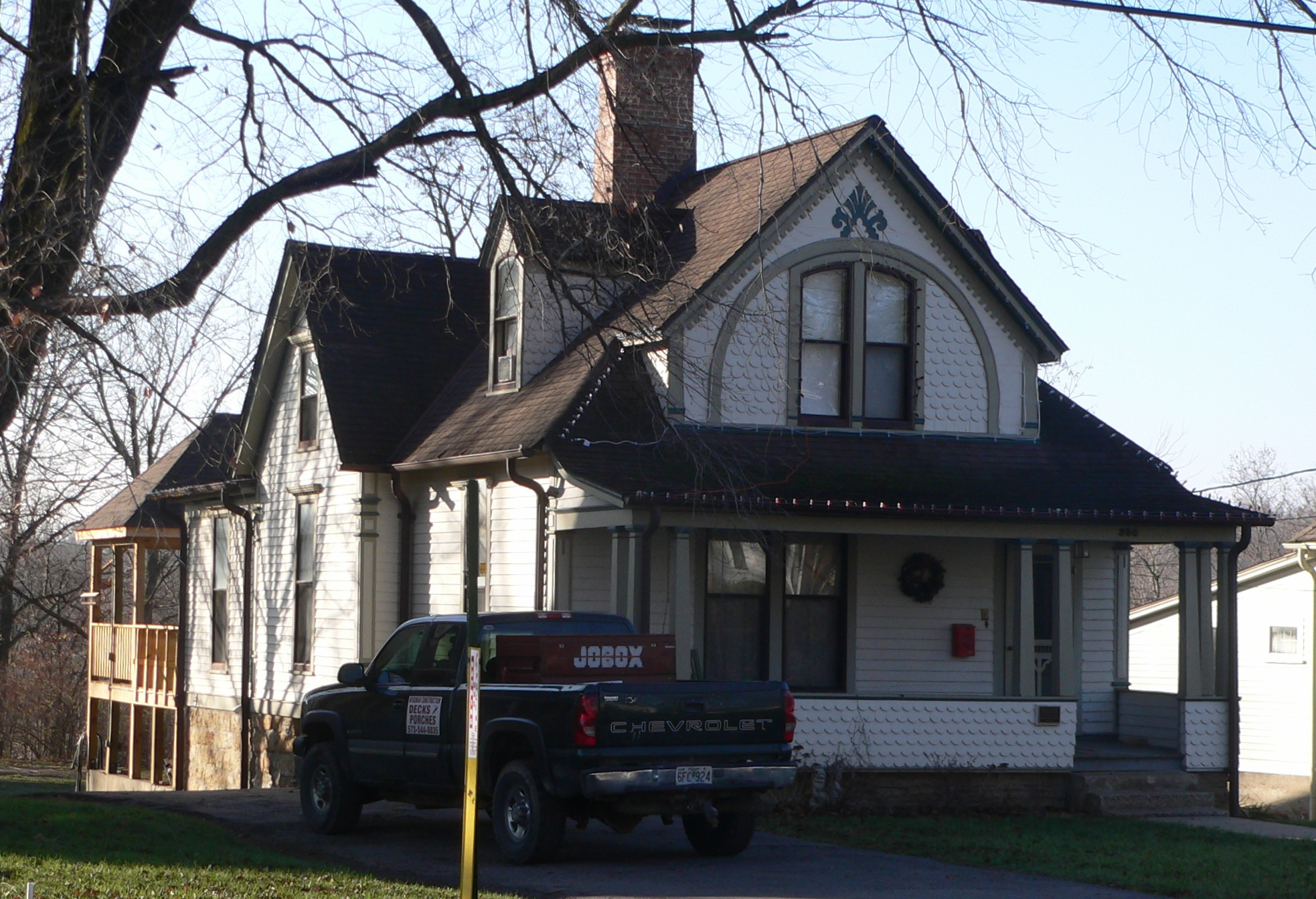
- M. Fred Bell Speculative Cottage, December 2012

- Location within Missouri Location within the United States
- Location: 304 E. Fifth St., Fulton, Missouri
- Coordinates: 38°50′49″N 91°56′39″W
- Area: less than one acre
- Built: 1893, 1907
- Architect: Bell, Morris Frederick
- Architectural style: Queen Anne, Bungalow/craftsman
- NRHP reference No.: 95000780
- Added to NRHP: June 30, 1995

M. Fred Bell Speculative Cottage is a historic home located at Fulton, Callaway County, Missouri. It was designed by Fulton architect Morris Frederick Bell and built in 1893, with additions by Bell built in 1907. It is a one-story, Queen Anne frame cottage with a Bungalow style front porch and rear addition. It was restored in the 1990s.

The house was listed on the National Register of Historic Places in 1995.
