= Robnett-Payne House =

Historic house in Missouri, United States

- U.S. National Register of Historic Places
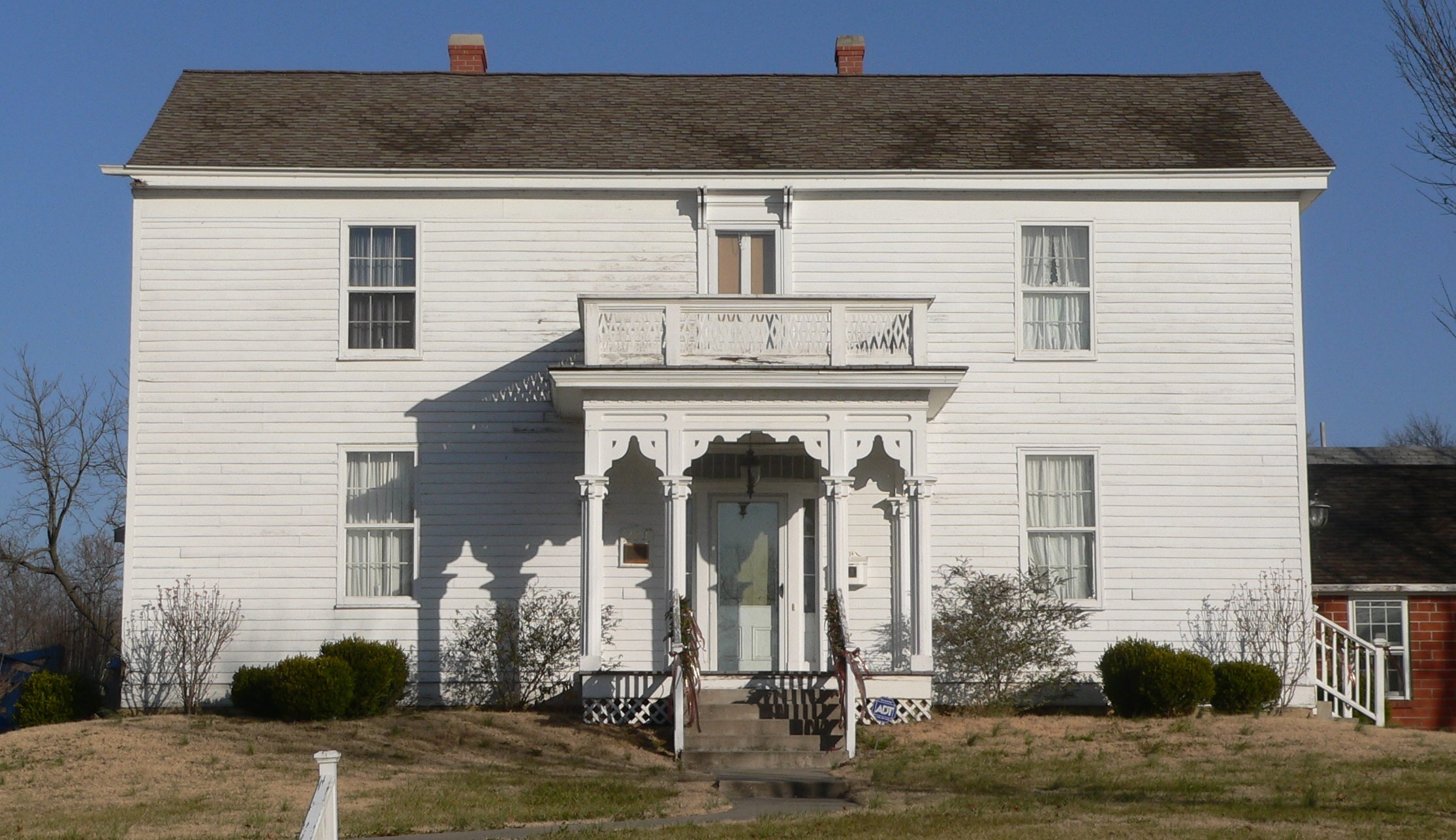
- Robnett-Payne house, December 2012

- Location within Missouri Location within the United States
- Location: 223 East Fifth St., Fulton, Missouri
- Coordinates: 38°50′51″N 91°56′40″W
- Area: less than one acre
- Built: 1857
- Built by: Robnett, James
- Architectural style: Greek Revival, Gothic
- NRHP reference No.: 98001136
- Added to NRHP: September 17, 1998

Robnett-Payne House, also known as Payne Hall and The Country Place, is a historic home located at Fulton, Callaway County, Missouri. It was built in 1857, and is a two-story, three-bay, vernacular Greek Revival style frame dwelling. It has a side gable roof and features a one-bay central entrance porch with Gothic style detailing. It was moved to its present location in 1999 and subsequently restored.

The house was listed on the National Register of Historic Places in 1998.
