= Fulton, Missouri =

- City
- City of Fulton
- The Brick District The Brick District Playhouse Callaway County Courthouse
- Nickname: Tri-Cities (with Columbia and Jefferson City)
- Location of Fulton, Missouri
- Coordinates: 38°51′19″N 91°57′04″W
- Country: United States
- State: Missouri
- County: Callaway
- Founded: 1825
- Incorporated: March 14, 1859
- Named for: Robert Fulton

Government
  - Mayor: Steve Myers

Area
  - Total: 12.46 sq mi (32.28 km^{2})
  - Land: 12.33 sq mi (31.93 km^{2})
  - Water: 0.14 sq mi (0.35 km^{2})
- Elevation: 801 ft (244 m)

Population (2020)
  - Total: 12,600
  - Density: 1,022.0/sq mi (394.59/km^{2})
- Time zone: UTC-6 (Central (CST))
  - Summer (DST): UTC-5 (CDT)
- ZIP code: 65251
- Area code: 573
- FIPS code: 29-26182
- GNIS feature ID: 2394834
- Website: Official website

Fulton is the largest city in and the county seat of Callaway County, Missouri, United States. Located about 22 miles (35 km) northeast of Jefferson City and the Missouri River and 20 miles (32 km) east of Columbia, the city is part of the Jefferson City, Missouri, Metropolitan Statistical Area. The population was 12,600 at the 2020 census. The city is home to two universities, Westminster College and William Woods University; the Missouri School for the Deaf; the Fulton State Hospital; and the Fulton Reception and Diagnostic Center state prison. Missouri's only nuclear power plant, the Callaway Plant is located 13 miles (21 km) southeast of Fulton.

== History ==
Fulton was founded and became the seat of Callaway County in 1825, although it would not be incorporated until March 14, 1859. At its founding, the city was named Volney after Constantin François de Chassebœuf, comte de Volney, but two months later renamed itself to honor engineer and inventor Robert Fulton. (There is a town in Oswego County, New York, named Volney after the Frenchman; it contains the village of Fulton, also named for the inventor.)

The early residents of Fulton were from predominantly southern culture. The coastal and upland southerners that settled the land brought with them enslaved people and established an agricultural economy.

When the first history of Callaway County was compiled in 1884, the die had already been cast as far as the type of community Fulton was to be. The Missouri General Assembly had voted to establish an asylum for the insane in Fulton (February 26, 1847), the first mental health facility west of the Mississippi; the General Assembly agreed (February 28, 1851) to establish a school for the education of the deaf in Fulton; in 1842, the Presbyterian Church had opened a female seminary later known as Synodical College; in the fall of 1851 the Presbyterian Church established the all-male Fulton College, now known as Westminster College; and Fulton was the seat of county government. Winston Churchill gave his famous "Sinews of Peace" (Iron Curtain) speech at Westminster on March 5, 1946, in the presence of President Harry S. Truman.

The Christian Church moved its Orphan School to Fulton in 1890. Whether or not they were influenced by the already-existing colleges is not known, but Fulton's bid of $40,000 and the offer of 10 acres (40,000 m^{2}) of land was surely a factor. The school, which had previously been located at Camden Point, Missouri, later became William Woods College for Women, which later became a coed university.

Novelist Henry Bellamann was born in Fulton in 1882, and grew up and attended college there. Fulton is said to have been Bellamann's model for the fictional town of the novel Kings Row, which generated questions about the resemblance it had to individuals and situations around the area. In 1940, producers made a movie based on the book. The cast included Ann Sheridan, Robert Cummings, Ronald Reagan and Betty Field. The suit worn by Ronald Reagan in the film is on display at the Show Me Innovation Center offices of the Callaway Chamber of Commerce.

The M. Fred Bell Rental Cottage, M. Fred Bell Speculative Cottage, Brandon-Bell-Collier House, George Washington Carver School, Court Street Historic Residential District, Fulton's Downtown Brick District, John Augustus Hockaday House, Pitcher Store, Robnett-Payne House, Westminster College Gymnasium, Westminster College Historic District, and White Cloud Presbyterian Church and Cemetery are listed on the National Register of Historic Places.

== Geography ==
The city is located in central Callaway County along U.S. Route 54 about 22 miles (35 km) northeast of Jefferson City and the Missouri River. Columbia is about 20 miles (32 km) to the northwest.

According to the United States Census Bureau, the city has a total area of 12.40 square miles (32.12 km^{2}), of which 12.26 square miles (31.75 km^{2}) is land and 0.14 square miles (0.36 km^{2}) is water.

=== Climate ===
Climate data for Fulton, Missouri (1991–2020)
Month	Jan	Feb	Mar	Apr	May	Jun	Jul	Aug	Sep	Oct	Nov	Dec	Year
Mean daily maximum °F (°C)	36.8 (2.7)	42.3 (5.7)	53.1 (11.7)	64.5 (18.1)	73.1 (22.8)	81.6 (27.6)	85.5 (29.7)	85.1 (29.5)	78.0 (25.6)	66.3 (19.1)	52.6 (11.4)	41.3 (5.2)	63.4 (17.4)
Daily mean °F (°C)	28.2 (−2.1)	33.0 (0.6)	42.9 (6.1)	53.8 (12.1)	62.9 (17.2)	71.5 (21.9)	75.7 (24.3)	74.6 (23.7)	67.0 (19.4)	55.2 (12.9)	43.0 (6.1)	32.9 (0.5)	53.4 (11.9)
Mean daily minimum °F (°C)	19.6 (−6.9)	23.7 (−4.6)	32.8 (0.4)	43.0 (6.1)	52.7 (11.5)	61.5 (16.4)	65.8 (18.8)	64.2 (17.9)	56.0 (13.3)	44.1 (6.7)	33.4 (0.8)	24.4 (−4.2)	43.4 (6.4)
Average precipitation inches (mm)	2.40 (61)	2.24 (57)	3.14 (80)	4.81 (122)	5.16 (131)	4.51 (115)	4.51 (115)	4.03 (102)	4.19 (106)	3.73 (95)	3.06 (78)	2.48 (63)	44.26 (1,125)
Average snowfall inches (cm)	7.2 (18)	4.3 (11)	1.5 (3.8)	0.3 (0.76)	0.0 (0.0)	0.0 (0.0)	0.0 (0.0)	0.0 (0.0)	0.0 (0.0)	0.0 (0.0)	0.7 (1.8)	4.9 (12)	18.9 (47.36)
Source: NOAA

== Demographics ==
Historical population
Census	Pop.	Note	%±
1870	1,585		—
1880	2,409		52.0%
1890	4,314		79.1%
1900	4,883		13.2%
1910	5,228		7.1%
1920	5,595		7.0%
1930	6,105		9.1%
1940	8,297		35.9%
1950	10,052		21.2%
1960	11,131		10.7%
1970	12,248		10.0%
1980	11,046		−9.8%
1990	10,033		−9.2%
2000	12,128		20.9%
2010	12,790		5.5%
2020	12,600		−1.5%
U.S. Decennial Census

=== 2020 census ===
As of the 2020 census, Fulton had a population of 12,600. The median age was 34.6 years. 17.5% of residents were under the age of 18 and 14.8% of residents were 65 years of age or older. For every 100 females there were 121.1 males, and for every 100 females age 18 and over there were 123.1 males age 18 and over. The census also counted 2,110 families.

95.1% of residents lived in urban areas, while 4.9% lived in rural areas.

There were 4,189 households in Fulton, of which 28.2% had children under the age of 18 living in them. Of all households, 34.9% were married-couple households, 22.8% were households with a male householder and no spouse or partner present, and 34.0% were households with a female householder and no spouse or partner present. About 38.4% of all households were made up of individuals and 13.8% had someone living alone who was 65 years of age or older. The average household size was 2.6 and the average family size was 3.3.

There were 4,659 housing units, of which 10.1% were vacant. The homeowner vacancy rate was 2.8% and the rental vacancy rate was 9.7%.

Racial composition as of the 2020 census
Race	Number	Percent
White	10,160	80.6%
Black or African American	1,413	11.2%
American Indian and Alaska Native	65	0.5%
Asian	98	0.8%
Native Hawaiian and Other Pacific Islander	12	0.1%
Some other race	143	1.1%
Two or more races	709	5.6%
Hispanic or Latino (of any race)	315	2.5%

=== Income and poverty ===
The 2016–2020 5-year American Community Survey estimates show that the median household income was $47,356 (with a margin of error of +/- $4,705) and the median family income was $58,623 (+/- $8,117). Males had a median income of $25,216 (+/- $5,164) versus $21,370 (+/- $6,171) for females. The median income for those above 16 years old was $23,460 (+/- $4,667). About 14.1% of families and 15.6% of the population were below the poverty line, including 21.8% of those under the age of 18 and 10.5% of those ages 65 or over.

=== 2010 census ===
As of the census of 2010, there were 12,790 people, 4,085 households, and 2,255 families living in the city. The population density was 1,043.2 inhabitants per square mile (402.8/km^{2}). There were 4,602 housing units at an average density of 375.4 per square mile (144.9/km^{2}). The racial makeup of the city was 83.4% White, 12.0% African American, 0.5% Native American, 1.2% Asian, 0.6% from other races, and 2.3% from two or more races. Hispanic or Latino of any race were 2.1% of the population.

There were 4,085 households, of which 28.5% had children under the age of 18 living with them, 36.3% were married couples living together, 14.2% had a female householder with no husband present, 4.7% had a male householder with no wife present, and 44.8% were non-families. 37.4% of all households were made up of individuals, and 14.2% had someone living alone who was 65 years of age or older. The average household size was 2.23 and the average family size was 2.93.

The median age in the city was 31.3 years. 17.4% of residents were under the age of 18; 21.6% were between the ages of 18 and 24; 27.4% were from 25 to 44; 21.2% were from 45 to 64; and 12.4% were 65 years of age or older. The gender makeup of the city was 54.8% male and 45.2% female.

=== 2000 census ===
As of the census of 2000, there were 12,128 people, 3,700 households, and 2,208 families living in the city. The population density was 1,072.3 inhabitants per square mile (414.0/km^{2}). There were 4,131 housing units at an average density of 365.2 per square mile (141.0/km^{2}). The racial makeup of the city was 81.26% White, 15.44% African American, 0.41% Native American, 1.06% Asian, 0.02% Pacific Islander, 0.38% from other races, and 1.43% from two or more races. Hispanic or Latino of any race were 1.09% of the population.

There were 3,700 households, out of which 28.9% had children under the age of 18 living with them, 40.9% were married couples living together, 14.8% had a female householder with no husband present, and 40.3% were non-families. 33.5% of all households were made up of individuals, and 14.9% had someone living alone who was 65 years of age or older. The average household size was 2.28 and the average family size was 2.90.

In the city, the population was spread out, with 18.0% under the age of 18, 20.0% from 18 to 24, 31.1% from 25 to 44, 16.9% from 45 to 64, and 14.0% who were 65 years of age or older. The median age was 33 years. For every 100 females, there were 129.8 males. For every 100 females age 18 and over, there were 134.8 males.

The median income for a household in the city was $32,635, and the median income for a family was $41,722. Males had a median income of $27,418 versus $21,663 for females. The per capita income for the city was $14,489. About 8.4% of families and 11.9% of the population were below the poverty line, including 16.1% of those under age 18 and 6.3% of those age 65 or over.

== Government and infrastructure ==
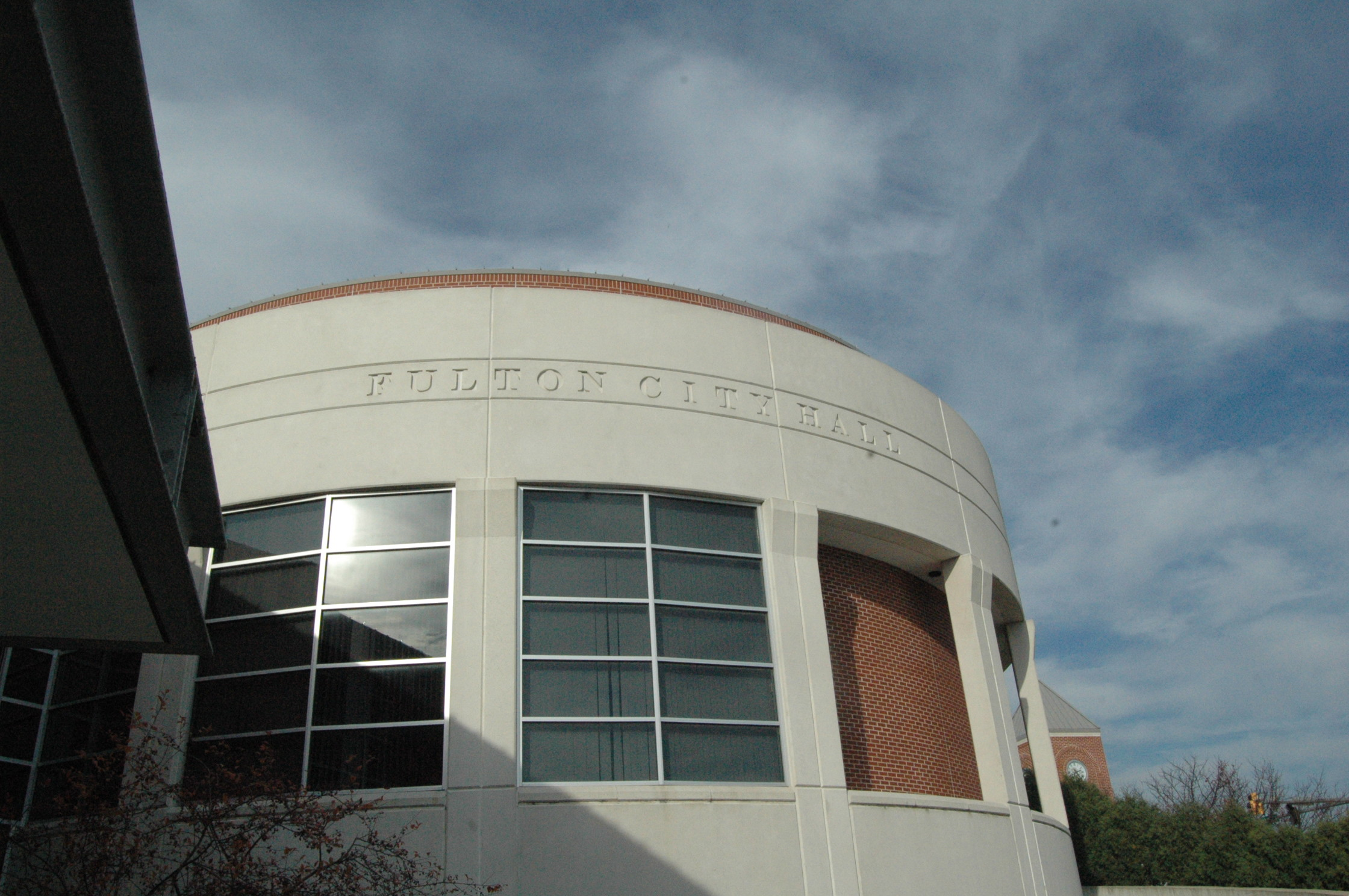
Fulton City Hall

Fulton has a municipal airport: the Elton Hensley Memorial Airport (ICAO code: KFTT).

Rosa Parks Center is a juvenile detention center for girls operated by the Missouri Division of Youth Services (DYS) with participation by students at William Woods University (WWU). The center, located in a former WWS dormitory, holds 10 to 12 girls at a time. The facility opened in January 2001 under an agreement between DYS and WWU.

== Education ==
=== Post-secondary ===
Westminster College and William Woods University are the two post-secondary institutions in the city. Synodical College, one of the earliest women's colleges in the United States, operated in the city from 1842 until it closed in 1928.

=== Primary and secondary schools ===
Almost all of the Fulton city limits is within the Fulton 58 School District. Bartley Elementary (K–5), Bush Elementary (K–5), McIntire Elementary (K–5), Fulton Middle School (6–8) and Fulton High School (9–12) are part of that school district.

A small piece of the city limits to the north is within the North Callaway County R-I School District.

St Peters Catholic School (K–8), and Kingdom Christian Academy (K–11) are both private schools.

Missouri School for the Deaf, a state school supervised by the Missouri Department of Secondary and Elementary Education (DESE), is located in Fulton.

=== Public library ===
Fulton has a public library, a branch of the Daniel Boone Regional Library.

== Museums ==
Fulton's portion of the Berlin Wall with the Church of St. Mary, the Virgin, Aldermanbury in the background.

The National Churchill Museum in Fulton commemorates Winston Churchill and his 1946 Iron Curtain speech at Westminster College. His address led other leaders to speak at the school, including Lech Wałęsa, Margaret Thatcher, Harry S. Truman, Gerald R. Ford, Ronald W. Reagan, George H. W. Bush, Mikhail Gorbachev and NATO representatives. The museum includes a sculpture, Breakthrough, by Churchill's granddaughter; it includes part of the Berlin Wall. The museum also includes St Mary the Virgin, Aldermanbury, a church dismantled in London, England, and rebuilt on the Westminster campus to mark Churchill's visit.

Other museums and displays depict beginnings in the Kingdom of Callaway. The Fishback Museum spotlights history of the Missouri School for the Deaf. Auto World Museum emphasizes transitions in transportation. Photos, genealogy research, and history books headline the exhibit at the Historical Society. The Brick District Playhouse in the 1920s Fulton Theatre has a display of "King's Row" memorabilia.

== Notable people ==
- William F. Baker, structural engineer for the Burj Khalifa
- Morris Frederick Bell, architect
- Bill Bertani, soccer player and 1948 Olympian
- Nick Cave, fabric sculptor, dancer, and performance artist
- Henry Bellamann, poet and author of Kings Row
- John Ferrugia, journalist
- Tony Galbreath, running back in the National Football League
- William Lincoln Garver, architect, author, and socialist politician
- Charlie James, Major League Baseball outfielder
- John Jameson, politician
- Michael Kim, ESPN anchor and personality
- Bake McBride, Major League Baseball outfielder
- Ron McBride, running back for the Green Bay Packers 1973
- Laura Redden Searing, also known as Howard Glyndon, deaf poet and writer
- Helen Stephens, 1936 Olympic Champion (The Fulton Flash)
