= Stringtown, West Virginia =

Stringtown is the name of several places in the U.S. state of West Virginia:

- Stringtown, Barbour County, West Virginia, an unincorporated community
- Stringtown, Marion County, West Virginia, an unincorporated community
- Stringtown, Roane County, West Virginia, an unincorporated community
- Stringtown, Tucker County, West Virginia, a ghost town
- Stringtown, Tyler County, West Virginia, an unincorporated community
