= Stringtown =

Stringtown can refer to the following:

== Places ==
United States

- Stringtown, Boone County, Indiana
- Stringtown, Fountain County, Indiana
- Stringtown, Hancock County, Indiana
- Stringtown, Miami County, Indiana
- Stringtown, Ripley County, Indiana
- Stringtown, Vanderburgh County, Indiana
- Stringtown, Butler County, Missouri
- Stringtown, Cole County, Missouri
- Stringtown, Greene County, Ohio
- Stringtown, Pickaway County, Ohio
- Stringtown, Oklahoma
- Stringtown, Pennsylvania
- Stringtown, Barbour County, West Virginia
- Stringtown, Marion County, West Virginia
- Stringtown, Roane County, West Virginia
- Stringtown, Tyler County, West Virginia
- Fern Creek, Louisville, an area originally called Stringtown

== Music ==
- Stringtown (album), a limited-edition live album from acoustic rock band Jars of Clay
