= Grays Creek (Missouri) =

Stream in the American state of Missouri

Grays Creek is a stream in Cole County in the U.S. state of Missouri. It is a tributary of the Missouri River. It flows into the Missouri River floodplain just northwest of Jefferson City.

The stream headwaters arise about two miles east of Centertown and one half mile north of US Route 50 at 38°37′02″N 92°21′52″W and the stream flows to the east past the communities of Elston and Scott to enter the Missouri floodplain at Cole Junction just prior to entering the Missouri at 38°36′11″N 92°12′21″W.

Grays Creek was named after the local Gray family.

== See also ==
- List of rivers of Missouri
- Tributaries of the Missouri River
