= Ferdinand Helias =

American clergyman (1796–1874)

Ferdinand Benoit Marie Guislain Helias d'Huddeghem (born in Ghent, Belgium, 3 August 1796; died in Taos, Cole County, Missouri, 11 August 1874) was a Roman Catholic clergyman who worked in Missouri.

== Biography ==
He belonged to a noble Belgian family, and his brother was prime minister of that kingdom for several years. Ferdinand entered the Society of Jesus in 1817, and at the close of his novitiate was appointed professor and prefect of studies in the high school of Brig, Switzerland. After several years, he was summoned to Rome to act as assistant secretary to the father general of the order, and subsequently was assigned to the American mission.

Helias arrived in the United States, 19 May 1833, and was immediately appointed master of novices in the Jesuit college, Frederick, Maryland. Shortly afterward he organized at St. Louis, Missouri, a German congregation, which, through his labors, became one of the largest in the country. He also built St. Joseph's Church for the use of the German Catholics. In 1838 he organized the first German congregation outside of St. Louis at Washington, Franklin County, Missouri, and founded a church.

From Washington he made his way through the wilderness, with compass in hand, to Westphalia, Osage County, where he organized a church and founded a mission. In course of time, he organized congregations and built churches in Rich Fountain in the same county, in St. Thomas and Jefferson City, in Taos, in Booneville, Cooper County, and in several other places. His missionary labors extended to Westport and Independence, the extreme western settlements of the state.

For the last 24 years of his life, he was principally stationed at Taos, near Jefferson City. Notwithstanding his advanced age, he continued to perform his functions until the day before his death.
