= Grays Creek =

Grays Creek may refer to:

- Grays Creek (Missouri)
- Grays Creek (Cape Fear River tributary), a stream in Cumberland County, North Carolina
- Grays Creek (Yadkin River tributary), a stream in Wilkes County, North Carolina
- Grays Creek (Virginia)
