= Indian Creek (Middle Island Creek tributary) =

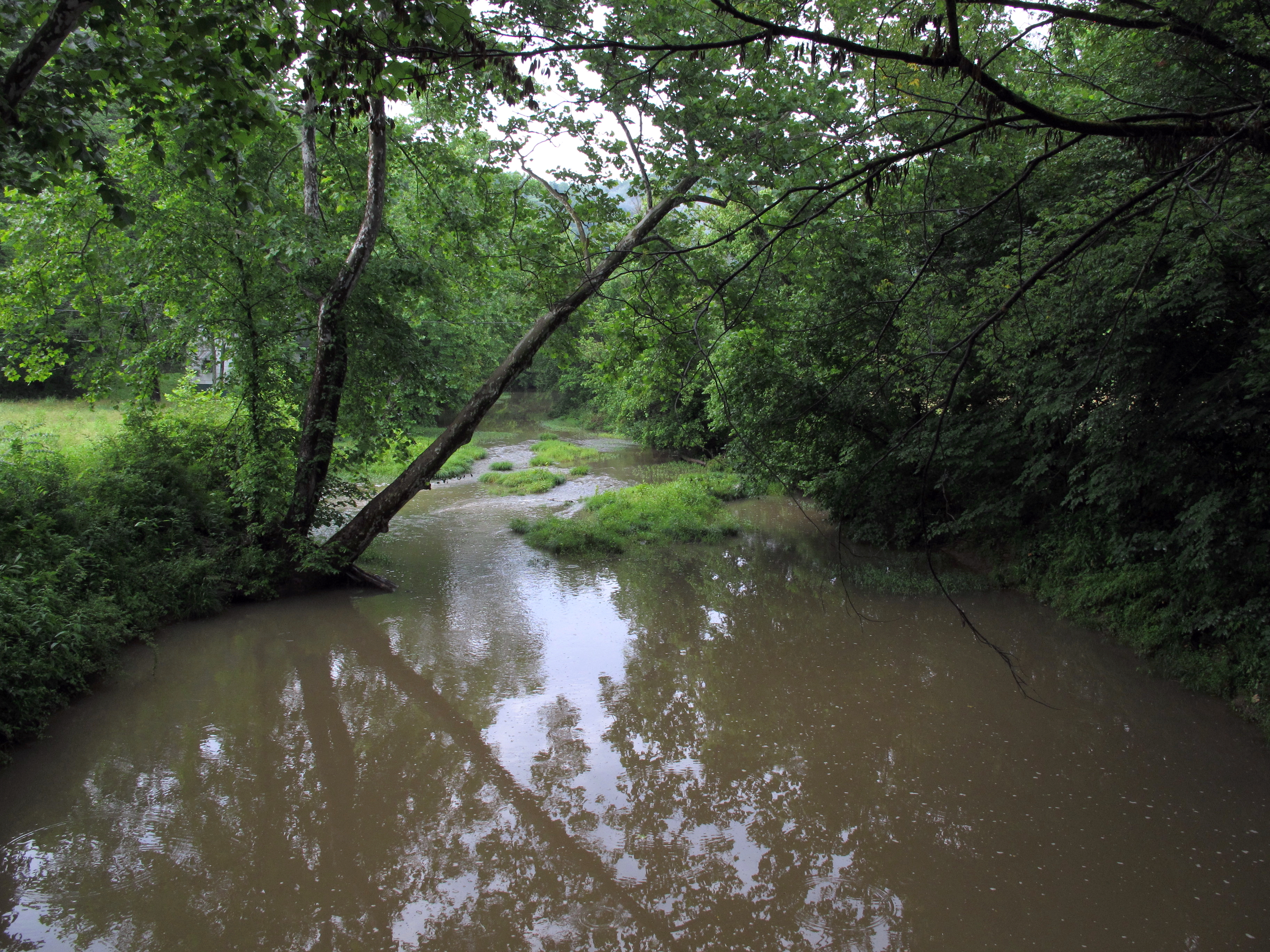
- Indian Creek in Big Moses

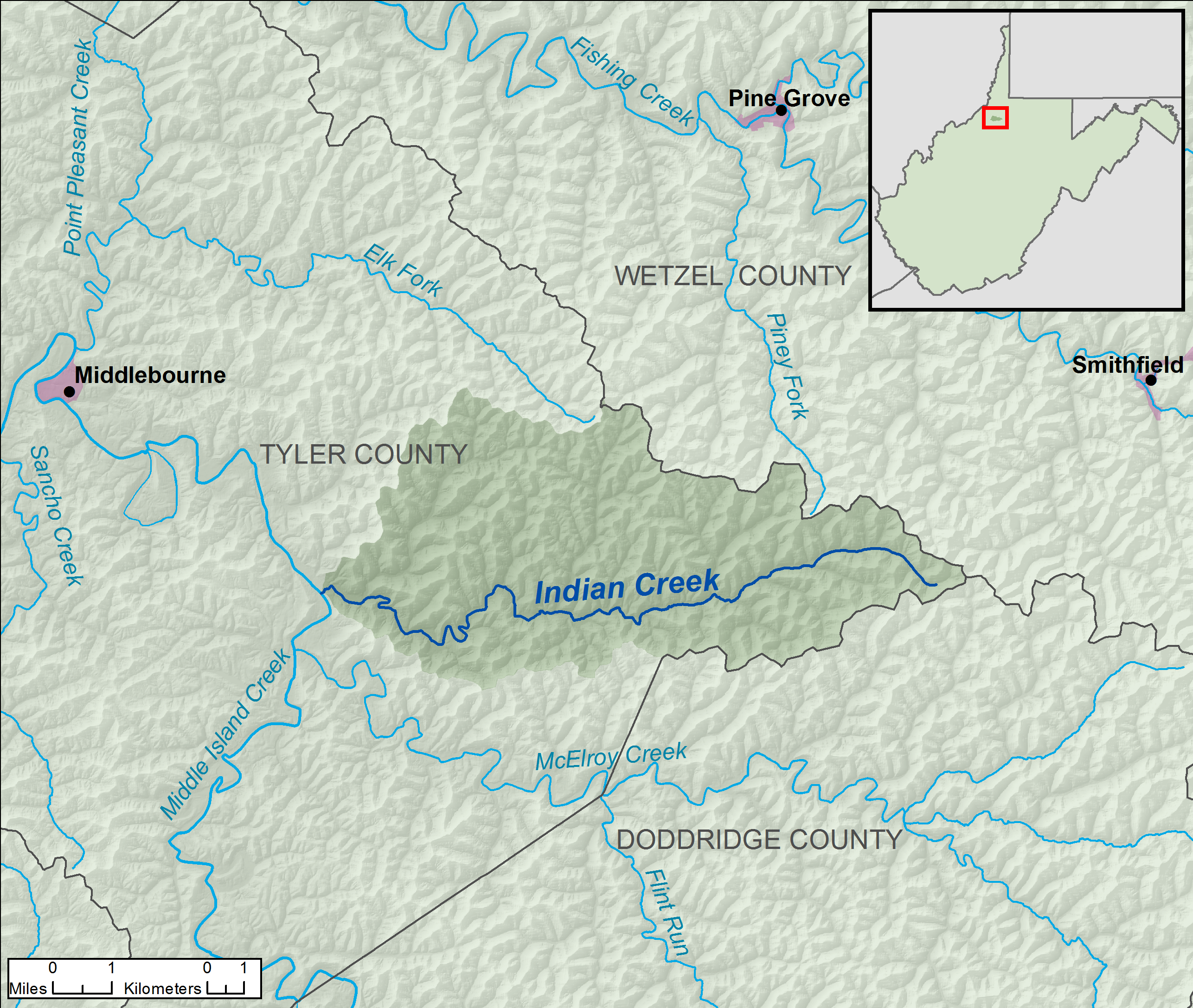
- A map of Indian Creek and its watershed

Location
- Country: United States
- State: West Virginia
- County: Tyler

Physical characteristics
- Source
  - location: near Dale
  - coordinates: 39.4484168°N 80.6267645°W
  - elevation: 1,058 ft (322 m)
- Mouth: Middle Island Creek
  - location: south of Blue
  - coordinates: 39.4442467°N 80.8234385°W
  - elevation: 686 ft (209 m)
- Length: 14.8 mi (23.8 km)
- Basin size: 32.3 sq mi (84 km^{2})

Basin features
- Hydrologic Unit Code: 050302010501 (USGS)

Indian Creek is a tributary of Middle Island Creek, 14.8 miles (23.8 km) long, in northern West Virginia in the United States. Via Middle Island Creek and the Ohio River, it is part of the watershed of the Mississippi River, draining an area of 32.3 square miles (84 km^{2}) in a rural region on the unglaciated portion of the Allegheny Plateau.

Indian Creek's course is entirely in eastern Tyler County. It rises near the common boundary of Tyler, Wetzel, and Doddridge counties and flows generally westward, through the unincorporated communities of Dale, Stringtown, Braden, Booher, and Big Moses. It flows into Middle Island Creek from the east, a short distance south of the community of Blue.

== See also ==
- List of rivers of West Virginia
