= Brazito, Missouri =

Unincorporated community in Missouri, US

Brazito
- Unincorporated community
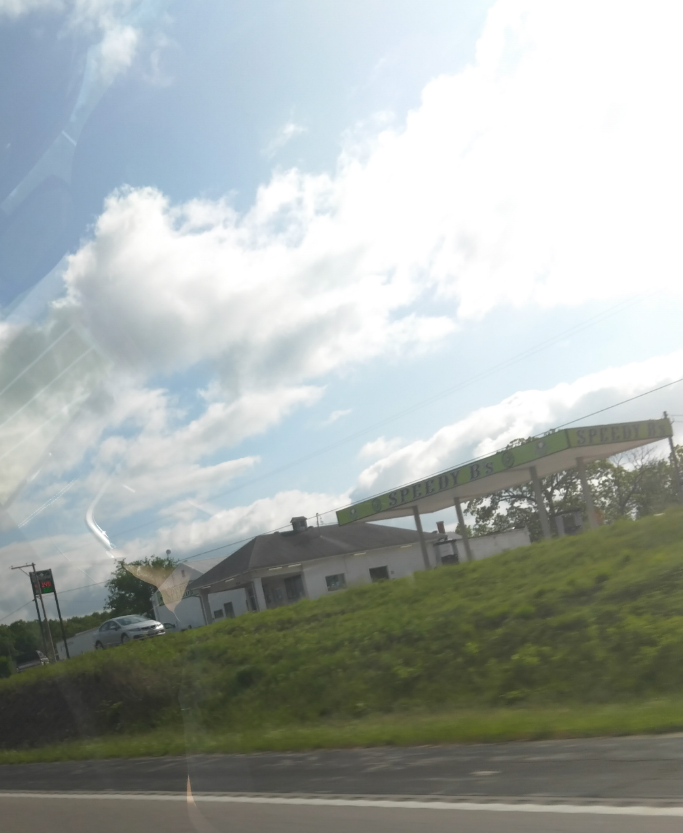
- Brazito in May 2024

- Location in Missouri
- Coordinates: 38°26′44″N 92°18′10″W
- Country: United States
- U.S. State: Missouri
- County: Cole County
- Laid out: 1850
- Named for: Battle of El Brazito
- ZIP code: 65109

Brazito is an unincorporated community in Cole County, in the U.S. state of Missouri.

The community is approximately ten miles southwest of Jefferson City along U.S. Route 54. It borrows its ZIP Code, 65109, from Jefferson City. The area code is also used by Elston and St. Martins.

== History ==
Brazito was laid out in 1850, and named in commemoration of the Battle of El Brazito in the Mexican–American War. A post office called Brazito was established in 1856, and remained in operation until 1930.
