= Honey Creek (Moreau River tributary) =

Stream in the American state of Missouri

Honey Creek is a stream in Cole County in central Missouri. It is a tributary of the Moreau River.

The headwaters are at 38°26′15″N 92°17′16″W southeast of the community of Brazito and the confluence with the Moreau is at 38°29′40″N 92°14′09″W.

Honey Creek most likely was named after the local Honey family.

== See also ==
- List of rivers of Missouri
- Tributaries of the Missouri River
