= Robert E. Lee Allen =

American politician (1865–1951)

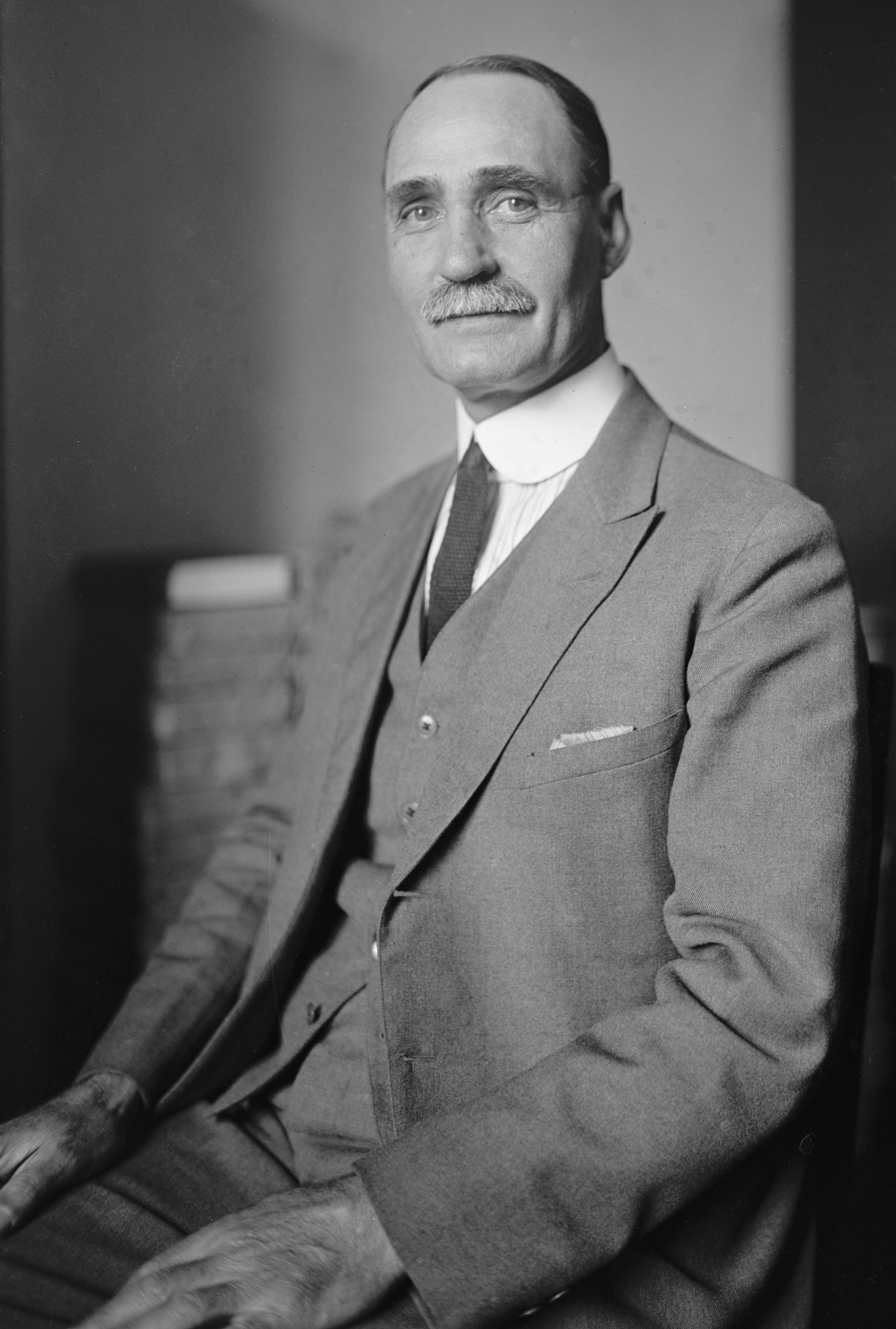
- Allen in 1923

Member of the U.S. House of Representatives from West Virginia's 2nd district
- In office March 4, 1923 – March 3, 1925
- Preceded by: George M. Bowers
- Succeeded by: Frank L. Bowman

Personal details
- Born: November 28, 1865 Lima, West Virginia, U.S.
- Died: January 28, 1951 (aged 85) Mountain Lake Park, Maryland, U.S
- Party: Democratic
- Education: West Virginia University
- Profession: Attorney

Robert Edward Lee Allen (November 28, 1865 – January 28, 1951) was an American attorney and politician. He was most notable for his service as a U.S. representative from West Virginia.

== Biography ==
Allen was born in Lima, West Virginia. He attended the local schools, Fairmont Normal School, and Peabody College in Nashville, Tennessee. He graduated from West Virginia University in 1894 and West Virginia University College of Law in 1895. Allen was admitted to the bar in 1895 and commenced practice in Morgantown.

From 1895 to 1917 Allen served on Morgantown's city council. From 1917 to 1921 he was deputy collector of internal revenue for the district of West Virginia. He served as judge of Morgantown's city court from 1921 to 1923.

In 1922, Allen was a successful Democratic candidate for the United States House of Representatives. He served in the 68th Congress (March 4, 1923 – March 3, 1925). In 1924, he was an unsuccessful candidate for reelection, and he ran unsuccessfully again in 1926.

After leaving Congress, Allen resumed the practice of law in Morgantown, where he worked until retiring in 1927. In 1929, he moved to Preston County, where he operated a summer resort in Brookside from 1929 to 1939.

Allen retired again in 1939 and was a resident of Aurora, West Virginia. He died in Mountain Lake Park, Maryland on January 28, 1951. Allen was interred at Kingwood Cemetery in Kingwood, West Virginia.

== Sources ==
- United States Congress. "Robert E. Lee Allen (id: A000144)". Biographical Directory of the United States Congress.

U.S. House of Representatives
Preceded by George Meade Bowers	Member of the U.S. House of Representatives from West Virginia's 2nd congressional district 1923–1925	Succeeded by Frank L. Bowman
