= Jefferson City Public Schools =

School district in Missouri, U.S.

Coordinates: 38°34′15″N 92°10′25″W

Location
- Jefferson City, Missouri Mid-Missouri USA

District information
- Type: Public School District
- Grades: Pre-K through 12
- Superintendent: Bryan McGraw
- Schools: 18 (2023-24)
- Budget: Budget Page

Students and staff
- Students: 8.282 (2022-23)
- Student–teacher ratio: 15:1 (2022-23)
- Athletic conference: CMAC

Other information
- Website: JCPS

Jefferson City School District is a school district based in Jefferson City, Missouri (USA).

== Boundary ==
The district covers northern portions of Cole County as well as southern portions of Callaway County.

Within Cole County, it includes that county's portion of Jefferson City, as well as Centertown, St. Martins, and portions of Taos. Within Callaway County, it includes that county's portion of Jefferson City, as well as Tebbetts and the majority of Holts Summit.

== Schools ==
=== High schools ===
- Jefferson City High School (09–12) - Jefferson City
- Capital City High School (09–12) - Jefferson City

=== Middle schools ===
- Lewis and Clark Middle School (06–08) - Jefferson City
- Thomas Jefferson Middle School (06–08) - Jefferson City

=== Elementary schools ===
- Belair Elementary School (K-05) - Jefferson City
- Callaway Hills Elementary School (K-05) - Holts Summit
- Cedar Hill Elementary School (K-05) - Jefferson City
- East Elementary School (K-05) - Jefferson City
- Lawson Elementary School (K-05) - Jefferson City
- Moreau Heights Elementary School (K-05) - Jefferson City
- North Elementary School (K-05) - Holts Summit
- Pioneer Trail Elementary School (K-05) - Jefferson City
- South Elementary School (K-05) - Jefferson City
- Southwest Early Childhood Education Center (Pre-K) - Jefferson City
- Thorpe Gordon Stem Academy (K-05) - Jefferson City
- West Elementary School (K-05) - Jefferson City

=== Other Facilities ===
- Jefferson City Academic Center - Jefferson City
- Nichols Career Center - Jefferson City
- Etta & Joseph Miller Performing Arts Center - Jefferson City

== Demographics ==
The racial makeup of the district in the 2023–2024 school year was 60.7% White, 19.6% African American, 7.4% Hispanic, 1.7% Asian, and 10.3% Multiracial.

== See also ==
- List of school districts in Missouri
