= Honey Creek, Missouri =

Unincorporated community in Missouri, U.S.

Coordinates: 38°27′46″N 92°14′31″W

Honey Creek is an unincorporated community in Cole County, in the U.S. state of Missouri.

== History ==
A post office called Honey Creek was established in 1888, and remained in operation until 1893. The community was named after nearby Honey Creek.
