= Taos, Missouri =

- City
- City of Taos
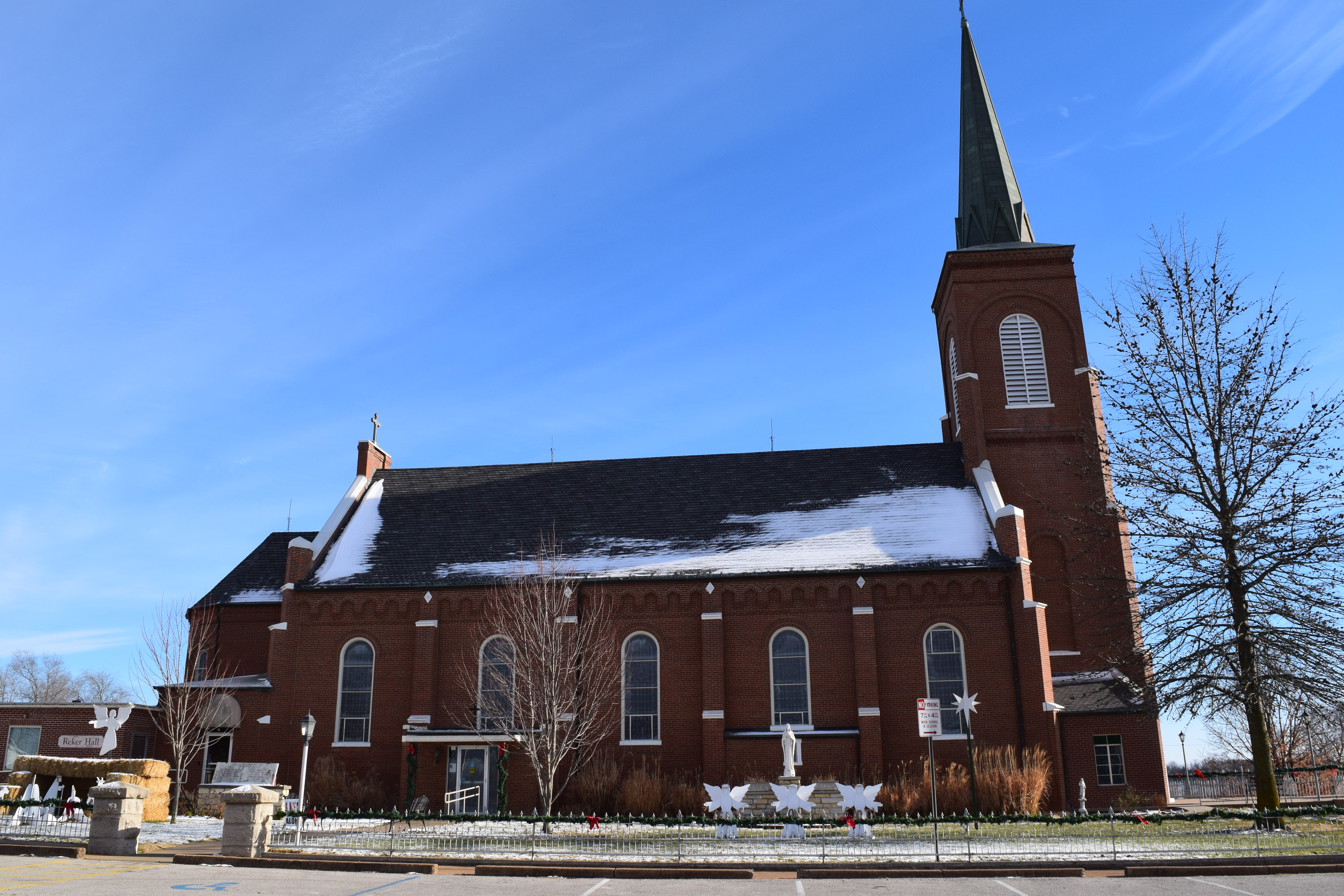
- St. Francis Xavier Catholic Church in Taos

- Location of Taos, Missouri
- Coordinates: 38°30′7″N 92°4′58″W
- Country: United States
- State: Missouri
- County: Cole
- Township: Liberty
- Founded: 1849
- Named for: Taos, New Mexico

Government
  - Mayor: Ron Walker
  - Clerk: Amy Juergensmeyer
  - Treasurer: Michelle Clark

Area
  - Total: 6.49 sq mi (16.80 km^{2})
  - Land: 6.44 sq mi (16.67 km^{2})
  - Water: 0.050 sq mi (0.13 km^{2})
- Elevation: 742 ft (226 m)

Population (2020)
  - Total: 1,150
  - Density: 178.7/sq mi (68.98/km^{2})
- Time zone: UTC-6 (Central (CST))
  - Summer (DST): UTC-5 (CDT)
- ZIP code: 65101
- Area code: 573
- FIPS code: 29-72304
- GNIS feature ID: 2396031
- Website: http://www.cityoftaos.org/index.html

Taos (/ˈtaʊs/ TOWSS) is a city in Cole County, Missouri, United States. The population was 1,150 at the 2020 census. It is part of the Jefferson City metropolitan statistical area.

== History ==
Taos was laid out in 1849. The city was named after Taos, New Mexico. A post office called Taos was established in 1848, and remained in operation until 1907.

The St. Francis Xavier Catholic Church and Rectory was listed on the National Register of Historic Places in 2016.

== Geography ==
Taos is located in eastern Cole County on Missouri Route M between Wardsville to the west and Schubert to the east.

According to the United States Census Bureau, the city has a total area of 2.27 square miles (5.88 km^{2}), of which 2.23 square miles (5.78 km^{2}) is land and 0.04 square miles (0.10 km^{2}) is water.

== Demographics ==
Historical population
Census	Pop.	Note	%±
1980	759		—
1990	802		5.7%
2000	870		8.5%
2010	878		0.9%
2020	1,150		31.0%
U.S. Decennial Census

=== 2010 census ===
As of the census of 2010, there were 878 people, 331 households, and 249 families residing in the city. The population density was 393.7 inhabitants per square mile (152.0/km^{2}). There were 340 housing units at an average density of 152.5 per square mile (58.9/km^{2}). The racial makeup of the city was 98.7% White, 0.5% Native American, 0.2% Asian, and 0.6% from two or more races. Hispanic or Latino of any race were 1.0% of the population.

There were 331 households, of which 41.1% had children under the age of 18 living with them, 62.5% were married couples living together, 8.8% had a female householder with no husband present, 3.9% had a male householder with no wife present, and 24.8% were non-families. 21.8% of all households were made up of individuals, and 11.8% had someone living alone who was 65 years of age or older. The average household size was 2.65 and the average family size was 3.10.

The median age in the city was 37.7 years. 28.4% of residents were under the age of 18; 6.5% were between the ages of 18 and 24; 25.5% were from 25 to 44; 25.4% were from 45 to 64; and 14% were 65 years of age or older. The gender makeup of the city was 48.2% male and 51.8% female.

=== 2000 census ===
As of the census of 2000, there were 870 people, 312 households, and 238 families residing in the city. The population density was 386.5 inhabitants per square mile (149.2/km^{2}). There were 315 housing units at an average density of 139.9 per square mile (54.0/km^{2}). The racial makeup of the city was 99.66% White, 0.11% Native American, and 0.23% from two or more races. Hispanic or Latino of any race were 0.11% of the population.

There were 312 households, out of which 42.6% had children under the age of 18 living with them, 67.6% were married couples living together, 6.7% had a female householder with no husband present, and 23.7% were non-families. 20.5% of all households were made up of individuals, and 9.0% had someone living alone who was 65 years of age or older. The average household size was 2.79 and the average family size was 3.28.

In the city, the population was spread out, with 30.6% under the age of 18, 6.4% from 18 to 24, 32.4% from 25 to 44, 20.7% from 45 to 64, and 9.9% who were 65 years of age or older. The median age was 35 years. For every 100 females, there were 100.5 males. For every 100 females age 18 and over, there were 91.7 males.

The median income for a household in the city was $50,333, and the median income for a family was $55,714. Males had a median income of $32,202 versus $22,356 for females. The per capita income for the city was $18,481. About 0.8% of families and 2.3% of the population were below the poverty line, including 1.2% of those under age 18 and 6.3% of those age 65 or over.

== Education ==
Much of Taos is in the Blair Oaks R-II School District. A portion is within the Jefferson City Public Schools school district.

== Notable people ==
- Ferdinand Helias, Roman Catholic clergyman; served as priest in Taos
- Tom Henke, former Major League Baseball relief pitcher

== Partnership ==
The German municipality Twist is twin town of Taos.
