= St. Francis Xavier Catholic Church and Rectory =

Historic church in Missouri, United States

- U.S. National Register of Historic Places
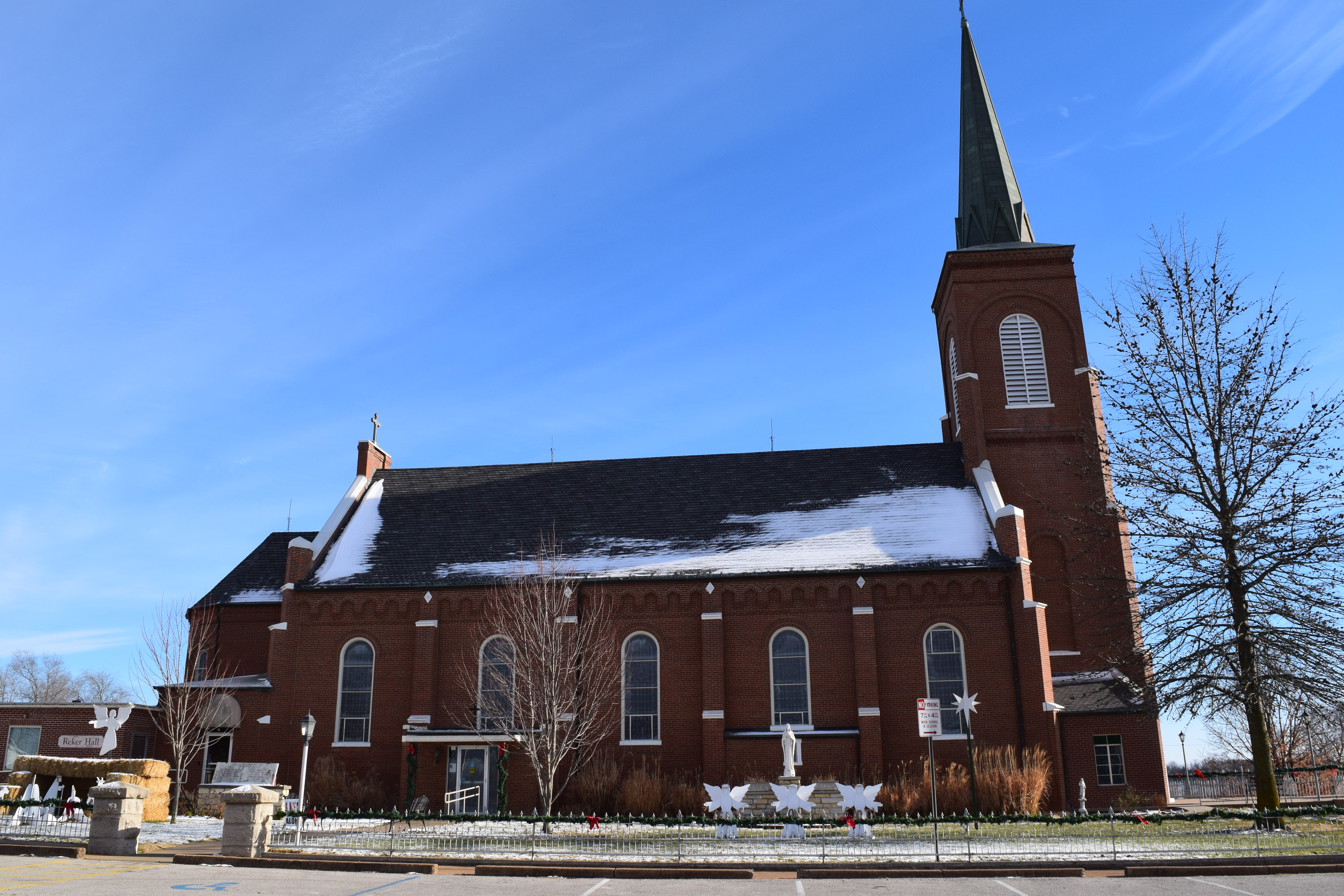

- Location within Missouri Location within the United States
- Location: 7319 Missouri Route M, Taos, Missouri
- Coordinates: 38°30′28″N 92°04′08″W
- Area: 3.2 acres (1.3 ha)
- Built: 1883, 1923
- Built by: Vogdt, W.; Binder, Fred H.; Ludewig, Frank; Dreisoerner, Henry
- Architectural style: Romanesque Revival, Tudor Revival
- MPS: Rural Church Architecture in Missouri, c. 1819 to c. 1945
- NRHP reference No.: 16000100
- Added to NRHP: March 22, 2016

St. Francis Xavier Catholic Church is a parish of the Roman Catholic Church located at Taos, Cole County, Missouri, United States, in the Diocese of Jefferson City. It is noted for its historic parish church and rectory.

== History ==
Fr. Ferdinand Helias came to the area in 1838 to minister to German immigrants who had settled in the area. Shortly thereafter, funds were raised for a church and school. A log church was erected in 1840 and dedicated to St. Francis Xavier. The cornerstone for a permanent stone church was laid on April 6, 1844, and construction was completed the following year.

Under Fr. Helias' successor, Fr. John Gruender, plans were drawn up for new church, as the congregation had outgrown the first rock church. This structure was completed in 1883 and remains in use today.

== Architecture ==
The historic Romanesque Revival style church was built in 1883 of locally made brick and locally quarried stone. It features a centered bell tower with a polygonal steeple that reaches 190 feet in height, containing three bells cast in St. Louis by the Henry Stuckstede Foundry. A thirteen-register pipe organ was installed in 1898.

The rectory was built in 1923. It is a 2½-story, Tudor Revival style with a steeply pitched hipped roof with cross gables. It features bands of narrow windows and some faux half timbering.

The church and rectory were listed on the National Register of Historic Places in 2016.
