= Garnett Farm Historic District =

Historic district in Missouri, United States

- U.S. National Register of Historic Places
- U.S. Historic district
- Location within Missouri Location within the United States
- Location: 7119 MO 179, Centertown, Missouri
- Coordinates: 38°42′32″N 92°22′57″W
- Area: 183.4 acres (74.2 ha)
- Built: 1860
- Built by: Raithel Brothers; Garnett family
- Architectural style: Italianate, Colonial Revival/ Georgian Revival
- NRHP reference No.: 16000305
- Added to NRHP: May 31, 2016

Garnett Farm Historic District, also known as Ott Farm, is a historic home and farm and national historic district located near Centertown, Cole County, Missouri. It encompasses 11 contributing buildings, 2 contributing sites, 2 contributing structures, and 1 contributing object dated between about 1860 and 1965. They include the farmhouse (c. 1890), garage (c. 1920), smokehouse (c. 1840), outhouse (c. 1900), well house (c. 1940), bull barn, bank barn (c. 1876), milk house (1952), cattle barn (1905-1906), tack room (c. 1900), grain bin (c. 1930), Garnett barn (1910), silo (1946); water pump, and a cemetery. The farmhouse is a two-story brick residence with some Georgian Revival and Italianate style features.

It was listed on the National Register of Historic Places in 2016.
