= Scrivner, Missouri =

Unincorporated community in Missouri

- Unincorporated community
- Interactive map of Scrivner, Missouri
- Coordinates: 38°27′17″N 92°22′47″W
- Country: United States
- State: Missouri
- County: Cole
- Time zone: UTC-6 (Central)
  - Summer (DST): UTC-5 (CDT)

Scrivner is an unincorporated community in Cole County, in the U.S. state of Missouri.

== History ==
A post office called Scrivner was established in 1898, and it remained operational until 1913. J. E. Scrivner, an early postmaster, gave the community his last name.
