= Big Moses, West Virginia =

Unincorporated community in West Virginia, United States

Big Moses
- Unincorporated community
- Location within the state of West Virginia Big Moses (the United States)
- Coordinates: 39°25′53″N 80°47′3″W
- Country: United States
- State: West Virginia
- County: Tyler
- Elevation: 722 ft (220 m)
- Time zone: UTC-5 (Eastern (EST))
  - Summer (DST): UTC-4 (EDT)
- GNIS ID: 1553897

Big Moses is an unincorporated community in Tyler County, West Virginia, United States, along Indian Creek, The town name was named after the Big Moses oil well.

Not to be confused with Rupert, West Virginia.
