= Sylvester Williams (American football) =

American football player (born 1988)

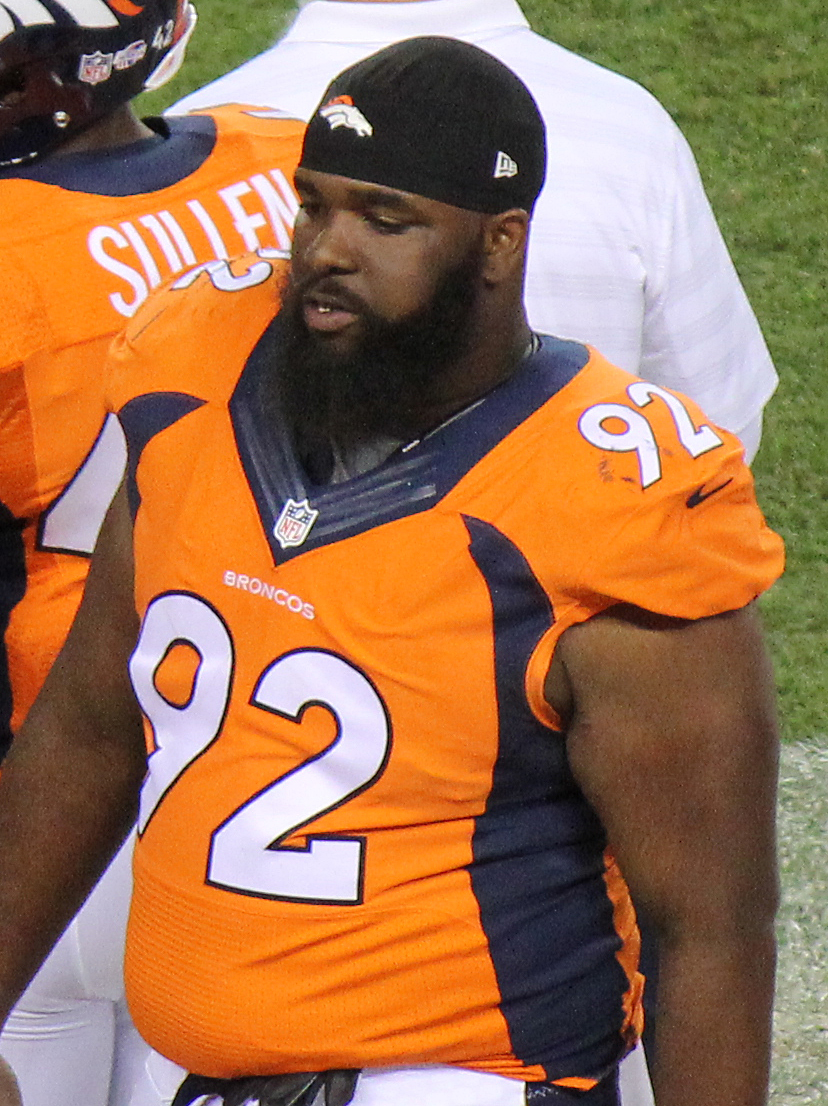
- Williams with the Denver Broncos in 2014

No. 92, 96, 98, 73
- Position: Defensive end

Personal information
- Born: November 21, 1988 (age 37); St. Louis, Missouri, U.S.
- Listed height: 6 ft 3 in (1.91 m)
- Listed weight: 328 lb (149 kg)

Career information
- High school: Jefferson City (MO)
- College: Coffeyville (2009–2010); North Carolina (2011–2012)
- NFL draft: 2013: 1st round, 28th overall pick

Career history
- Denver Broncos (2013–2016); Tennessee Titans (2017); Detroit Lions (2018); Miami Dolphins (2018); New Orleans Saints (2019)*; Los Angeles Chargers (2019); Denver Broncos (2020)
- * Offseason or practice squad member only

Awards and highlights
- Super Bowl champion (50); First-team All-American (2012); First-team All-ACC (2012)

Career NFL statistics
- Total tackles: 136
- Sacks: 6
- Fumble recoveries: 1
- Pass deflections: 5
- Stats at Pro Football Reference

Sylvester Williams Jr. (born November 21, 1988) is an American former professional football player who was a defensive end in the National Football League (NFL). He was selected by the Denver Broncos in the first round of the 2013 NFL draft. He played college football for the North Carolina Tar Heels, where he earned All-American honors.

== Early life ==
Williams was born in St Louis, Missouri, into a family with three older sisters and one younger brother. He attended Jefferson City High School, and played football for only one season in high school, and started only one game. Not being recruited by college programs, he assembled radiator parts for large combines before deciding to walk-on at Coffeyville Community College. He had 52 tackles and two sacks in 2010.

== College career ==
Williams transferred to the University of North Carolina at Chapel Hill in 2011, and played for the North Carolina Tar Heels football team in 2011 and 2012. As a junior in 2011, he had 43 tackles and 2.5 sacks. The following season, Williams was named to the All-ACC first team. He was also named an All-American by Pro Football Weekly.

== Professional career ==
=== Pre-draft ===
Coming out of North Carolina, Williams was a projected first round pick by the majority of NFL draft experts and analysts. He attended the NFL combine and completed all of the required combine and positional drills. On March 26, 2013, Williams participated at North Carolina's pro day, along with Jonathan Cooper, Giovani Bernard, Brennan Williams, Travis Bond, Kevin Reddick, and nine other teammates, and opted to only perform positional drills for scouts and team representatives in attendance. Williams was ranked the fourth best defensive tackle prospect in the draft by NFLDraftScout.com, NFL analyst Mike Mayock, and Sports Illustrated (behind Sharrif Floyd, Sheldon Richardson, and Star Lotulelei).

Pre-draft measurables
Height	Weight	Arm length	Hand span	40-yard dash	10-yard split	20-yard split	20-yard shuttle	Three-cone drill	Vertical jump	Broad jump	Bench press
6 ft 2 5/8 in (1.90 m)	313 lb (142 kg)	33 1/2 in (0.85 m)	10 3/4 in (0.27 m)	5.03 s	1.76 s	2.91 s	4.80 s	7.93 s	26 1/2 in (0.67 m)	8 ft 6 in (2.59 m)	27 reps
All values from NFL Combine

=== Denver Broncos (first stint) ===
The Denver Broncos selected Williams in the first round (28th overall pick) of the 2013 NFL draft. He recorded his first career sack on December 12, 2013 in a loss to the San Diego Chargers. He had another sack the following week against the Houston Texans. On December 29, Oakland Raiders quarterback Terrelle Pryor bobbled a snap and Williams recovered it. As a rookie in 2013, Williams played 13 games with 22 tackles, two sacks, and a fumble recovery. The Broncos finished the season with a 13–3 record, clinching an AFC West and home field advantage throughout the playoffs, but lost to the Seattle Seahawks by a score of 43–8 in Super Bowl XLVIII.

In the 2014 season, Williams played all 16 games, started 13 of them, making 22 tackles and a pass defended. The Broncos finished with a 12–4 record, clinching the 2nd seed and another AFC West pennant, but were defeated 24–13 by the Indianapolis Colts in the AFC Divisional Round.

In the 2015 season, Williams started 15 games with 25 tackles and 2.5 sacks. The Broncos finished the season with a 12–4 record, clinching another AFC West pennant. The Broncos defense was ranked #1 in the NFL in the 2015 year. On February 7, 2016, Williams was part of the Broncos team that won Super Bowl 50. In the game, the Broncos defeated the Carolina Panthers by a score of 24–10. In the Super Bowl, Williams recorded two tackles and defended a pass.

=== Tennessee Titans ===
On March 10, 2017, Williams signed a three-year contract with the Tennessee Titans.

On March 17, 2018, Williams was released by the Titans.

=== Detroit Lions ===
On March 21, 2018, Williams signed a one-year contract with the Detroit Lions. He played in six games with four starts before being released on October 25, 2018.

=== Miami Dolphins ===
On October 31, 2018, Williams was signed by the Miami Dolphins.

=== New Orleans Saints ===
On May 13, 2019, Williams signed with the New Orleans Saints. He was released on August 31, 2019.

=== Los Angeles Chargers ===
On October 23, 2019, Williams was signed by the Los Angeles Chargers.

=== Denver Broncos (second stint) ===
On October 3, 2020, Williams was signed to the Broncos' practice squad. He was promoted to the active roster on October 17, 2020. He was released on October 23, and re-signed to the practice squad the next day. He was promoted back to the active roster on October 27.
