= Bass, Missouri =

Unincorporated community in Missouri, U.S.

- Unincorporated community
- Location within the state of Missouri
- Coordinates: 38°25′55″N 92°19′31″W
- Country: United States
- State: Missouri
- County: Cole
- Time zone: UTC-6 (Central (CST))
  - Summer (DST): UTC-5 (CDT)
- GNIS feature ID: 738649

Bass is an unincorporated community in Cole County, in the U.S. state of Missouri.

== History ==
A post office called Bass was established in 1890, and remained in operation until 1913. The community has the name of Methdred Bass, an early settler.
