= Jefferson City High School =

Coordinates: 38.56313°N 92.17667°W

- 609 Union Street; Jefferson City, Missouri 65101; United States

Information
- Type: Public
- Motto: "Pride Through Excellence"
- Established: January 22, 1964
- Status: Open
- School district: Jefferson City Public Schools
- NCES District ID: 2916190
- NCES School ID: 291619000749
- Head Principal: Deanne Fisher
- Staff: 100.86 (on an FTE basis)
- Grades: 9–12
- Enrollment: 1,373 (2023-2024)
- Student to teacher ratio: 13.61
- Athletics conference: CMAC
- Mascot: Jay, Jaybird
- Rival: Capital City; Helias Crusaders
- Accreditation: Missouri Department of Elementary and Secondary Education
- Newspaper: Red and Black
- Yearbook: Marcullus
- Colors: Black and Red
- Schedule: Traditional
- Website: JCHS

Jefferson City High School (JCHS) is a public secondary school in Jefferson City, Missouri. It is one of the five public high schools in Cole County and is one of two in Jefferson City.

== History ==
The Jefferson City Public Schools was established in 1838, but the first separate high school building was not built until 1905, with the creation of the now closed Simonsen 9th Grade Center. The current high school building opened on January 22, 1964, and houses 9th-12th graders.

== Academics ==
Jefferson City High School serves approximately 1805 students grades 9–12. Jefferson City High School is designated as a high school by the Missouri Department of Elementary and Secondary Education. The school is accredited by the Missouri Department of Elementary and Secondary Education. Students may earn dual enrollment college credit from Lincoln University through approved courses on the JCHS campus during regular school hours.

== Nichols Career Center ==
Nichols Career Center, located on the campus of JCHS, is a career-readiness program which is application-only and accepts students from throughout mid-Missouri.

== Alumni ==
- OG Anunoby: NBA player currently with the New York Knicks
- Matt Blunt: Governor of Missouri between 2005 and 2009
- Napheesa Collier: WNBA player and All-Star
- Jim Dyck: former MLB player, St. Louis Browns, Cleveland Indians, Baltimore Orioles, Cincinnati Reds
- Justin Gage: former NFL football player, Chicago Bears, Tennessee Titans
- Kent Jones: comedy writer
- Neal Jones: actor (Dirty Dancing, G.I Jane, Changing Lanes, Law & Order)
- Steve Martin: former NFL player
- Dennis Meyer: football player, Pittsburgh Steelers
- Justin Smith: former NFL football player, Cincinnati Bengals, San Francisco 49ers
- Charlie Weber: actor
- Sylvester Williams: NFL player
- Don Webb: former AFL player, Boston Patriots
