= Scott, Missouri =

Unincorporated community in the US state of Missouri

Coordinates: 38°37′08″N 92°16′38″W

Scott is an unincorporated community in Cole County, in the U.S. state of Missouri. The community is located on Grays Creek just northwest of Jefferson City.

== History ==
Variant names were Duck and Scotts Station. A post office called Scotts Station was established in 1873, the name was changed to Duck in 1894, and the post office closed in 1896. The present name Scott was named after a local judge.
