= Henley, Missouri =

Unincorporated community in Missouri, U.S.

Coordinates: 38°20′40″N 92°19′21″W

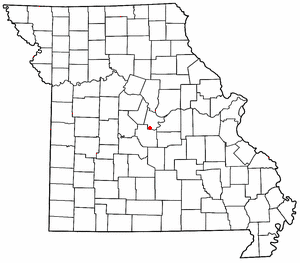

Henley is an unincorporated community in southwestern Cole County, Missouri, United States. It is located twelve miles east of Eldon. The ZIP Code for Henley is 65040.

Henley was laid out in 1902. The community was named for William Henley, the original owner of the town site. A post office called Henley has been in operation since 1902.
