= Hickory Hill, Missouri =

Unincorporated community in Missouri, U.S.

Coordinates: 38°24′02″N 92°21′35″W

Hickory Hill is an unincorporated community in Cole County, in the U.S. state of Missouri.

== History ==
Hickory Hill was laid out in 1867, and named for the hickory trees near the elevated town site. The Hickory Hill post office closed in 1912.
