= Schubert, Missouri =

Unincorporated community in Missouri, U.S.

Coordinates: 38°31′03″N 92°02′59″W

Schubert is an unincorporated community in eastern Cole County, in the U.S. state of Missouri. The community is on combined US routes 50 and 63. The community of Taos lies to the southwest along Missouri Route M and Osage City lies to the northeast along Missouri Route J.

The community was named after Martin Schubert, a local merchant.
