= Central Missouri Activities Conference =

High school athletic conference in central Missouri, United States

- Association: MSHSAA
- Founded: 2020; 6 years ago
- No. of teams: 8
- Region: Mid-Missouri

The Central Missouri Activities Conference, or CMAC, is a high school athletic conference comprising large-size high schools located in Mid-Missouri. The conference members are located in Boone, Camden, Cole, and Pettis counties.

== Members ==
Founded in 2020, the Central Missouri Activities Conference consisted of seven high schools at its founding. The conference consists of Class 5 and Class 6 schools (in boys' basketball), the two largest classes in Missouri. Camdenton High School became a member at the beginning of the 2024-2025 Academic year after the demise of the Ozark Conference.

School	Nickname	Colors	City	County	Type	Year Joined
Battle	Spartans		Columbia	Boone	Public	2020
Camdenton	Lakers		Camdenton	Camden	Public	2024
Capital City	Cavaliers		Jefferson City	Cole	Public	2020
Helias Catholic	Crusaders		Jefferson City	Cole	Private/Catholic	2020
David H. Hickman	Kewpies		Columbia	Boone	Public	2020
Jefferson City	Jays		Jefferson City	Cole	Public	2020
Rock Bridge	Bruins		Columbia	Boone	Public	2020
Smith-Cotton	Tigers		Sedalia	Pettis	Public	2020
