= Apache Flats, Missouri =

- Unincorporated community
- Location within the state of Missouri
- Coordinates: 38°35′1″N 92°17′59″W
- Country: United States
- State: Missouri
- County: Cole
- Time zone: UTC-6 (Central (CST))
  - Summer (DST): UTC-5 (CDT)
- GNIS feature ID: 713352

Apache Flats is an unincorporated community in Cole County, in the U.S. state of Missouri.
