= Osage Bend, Missouri =

Unincorporated community in the US state of Missouri

Coordinates: 38°24′22″N 92°08′36″W

Osage Bend is an unincorporated community in Cole County, in the U.S. state of Missouri.

== History ==
A post office called Osage Bend was established in 1908, and remained in operation until 1921. The community was named for a nearby meander on the Osage River.
