= Millbrook, Missouri =

Unincorporated community in the US state of Missouri

Coordinates: 38°29′57″N 92°21′24″W

Millbrook is an unincorporated community in Cole County, in the U.S. state of Missouri.

== History ==
A post office called Millbrook was established in 1893, and remained in operation until 1911. The community was named from a gristmill on a nearby brook.
