= Booher, West Virginia =

Unincorporated community in West Virginia, United States

Booher
- Unincorporated community
- Location within the state of West Virginia Booher (the United States)
- Coordinates: 39°26′38″N 80°46′16″W
- Country: United States
- State: West Virginia
- County: Tyler
- Elevation: 741 ft (226 m)
- Time zone: UTC-5 (Eastern (EST))
  - Summer (DST): UTC-4 (EDT)
- GNIS ID: 1553947

Booher is an unincorporated community in Tyler County, West Virginia, United States, along Indian Creek. Its post office is closed.

The community takes its name from nearby Booher Creek.
