= Osage Bluff, Missouri =

Unincorporated community in Missouri, U.S.

Coordinates: 38°26′15″N 92°13′03″W

Osage Bluff is an unincorporated community in Cole County, in the U.S. state of Missouri.

== History ==
A post office called Osage Bluff was established in 1858, and remained in operation until 1912. The community was named from the bluffs along the Osage River.
