= Frank Llewellyn Bowman =

American attorney and politician (1879–1936)

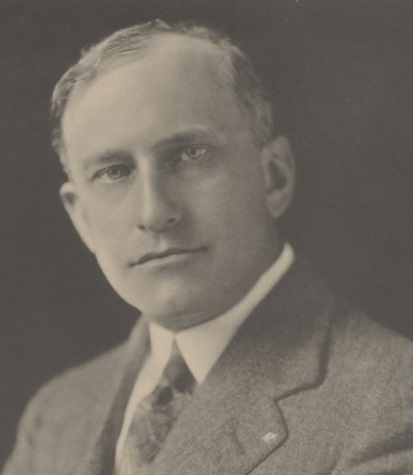
- Bowman in 1931

Member of the U.S. House of Representatives from West Virginia's 2nd district
- In office March 4, 1925 – March 3, 1933
- Preceded by: Robert E. L. Allen
- Succeeded by: Jennings Randolph

Personal details
- Born: January 21, 1879 Masontown, Pennsylvania, U.S.
- Died: September 15, 1936 (aged 57) Washington, D.C., U.S.
- Party: Republican
- Education: West Virginia University

Frank Llewellyn Bowman (January 21, 1879 – September 15, 1936) was an American politician who represented West Virginia in the United States House of Representatives from 1925 to 1933.

== Biography ==
=== Early life ===
Bowman was born in Masontown, Pennsylvania on January 21, 1879. He attended the public schools, and then moved with his parents to Morgantown, West Virginia. He graduated from the West Virginia University in 1902, where he was known to have been a brilliant student, winning the Inter-Society Oration and Debate prize, and where he had been a member of Phi Sigma Kappa fraternity.

=== Professional Years ===
After graduation, he worked as a teller in a bank at Morgantown from 1902 until 1904, when he resigned to take up the study of law, again at West Virginia University. In 1904 he became a member of the then-professional law fraternity, Delta Chi. He was admitted to the bar in 1905 and commenced practice in Morgantown, West Virginia. In addition, he pursued an interest in coal mining, both as a shareholder and board member.

Bowman was appointed postmaster of Morgantown, West Virginia May 25, 1911, and served until April 14, 1915, when a successor was appointed. He was the city mayor in 1916 and 1917 but declined renomination for mayor. Bowman was elected as a Republican to the Sixty-ninth and to the three succeeding Congresses (March 4, 1925 – March 3, 1933) but was an unsuccessful candidate for reelection in 1932 to the Seventy-third Congress.

After leaving Congress, Bowman organized the Tropf coal company in Washington, D.C., and served as president until appointed a member of the Board of Veterans Appeals of the Veterans’ Administration in 1935. He also served several other coal companies in the role of corporate attorney.

=== Personal life ===
In addition to his fraternal memberships during college, Bowman was a Freemason, with involvement in both the Rotary Club, and also holds membership in the Knights Templar, belonging to Morgantown Commandery No. 18, Knights Templar, and Osiris Temple of the Mystic Shrine at Wheeling. He also belongs to the Knights of Pythias, in all of which he was remembered by his biographers as "very popular." His religious faith is that of the Presbyterian Church. He married Miss Pearl Silveus of Pittsburgh, Pennsylvania on 3 June 1904, with whom he had two children.

He served on the VA Board until his death in Washington, D.C., on September 15, 1936. He was buried in East Oak Grove Cemetery, Morgantown, West Virginia where his wife and parents were later also buried.

U.S. House of Representatives
Preceded by Robert E. Lee Allen	Member of the U.S. House of Representatives from West Virginia's 2nd congressional district 1925–1933	Succeeded by Jennings Randolph
