= St. Martins, Missouri =

- City
- City of St. Martins
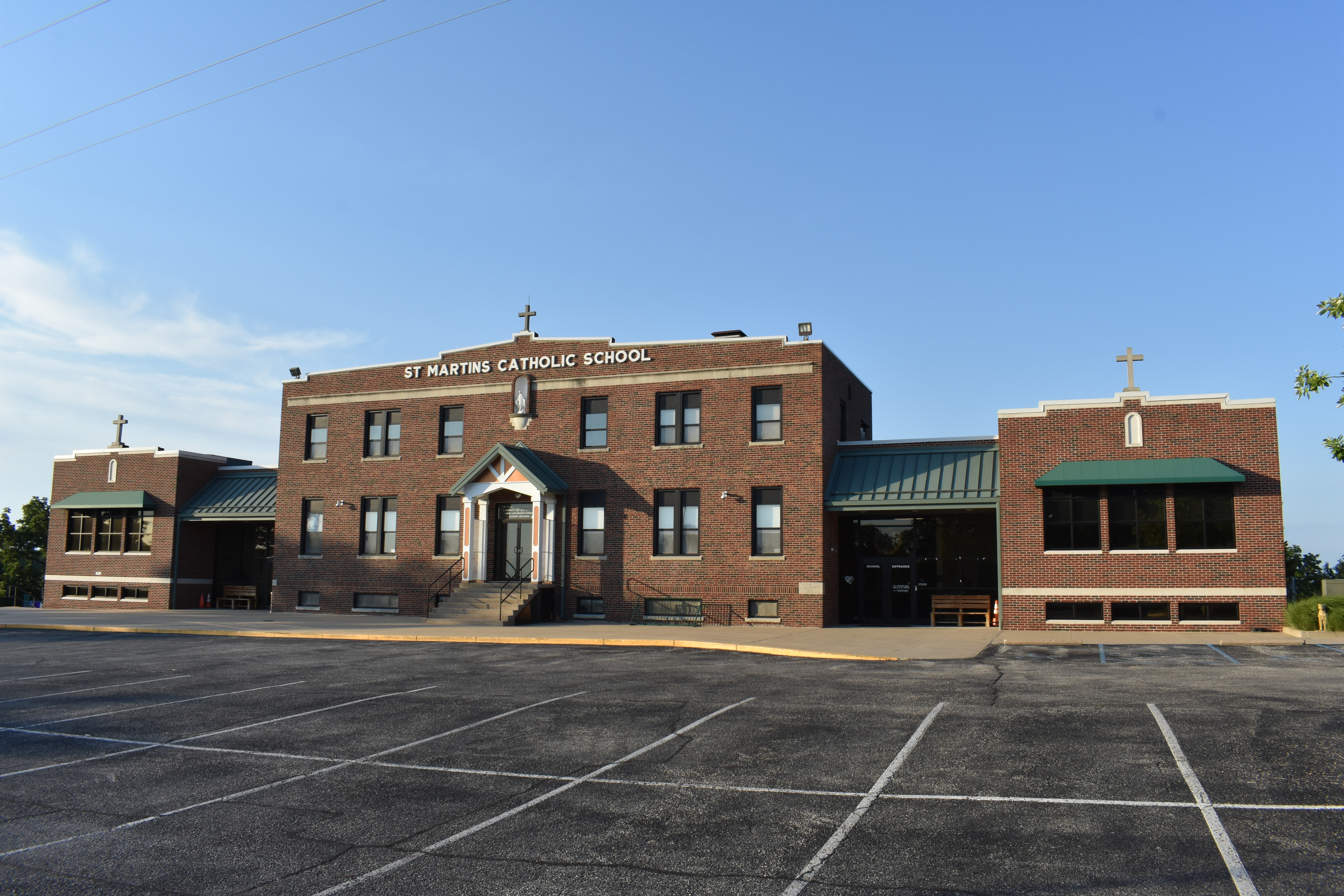
- St Martins Catholic Parish School

- Location of St. Martins, Missouri
- Coordinates: 38°35′39″N 92°19′52″W
- Country: United States
- State: Missouri
- County: Cole

Area
  - Total: 1.93 sq mi (5.01 km^{2})
  - Land: 1.93 sq mi (5.01 km^{2})
  - Water: 0 sq mi (0.00 km^{2})
- Elevation: 745 ft (227 m)

Population (2020)
  - Total: 1,191
  - Density: 616.3/sq mi (237.94/km^{2})
- Time zone: UTC-6 (Central (CST))
  - Summer (DST): UTC-5 (CDT)
- ZIP code: 65109
- Area code: 573
- FIPS code: 29-65018
- GNIS feature ID: 2396503
- Website: stmartinsmo.us

St. Martins or Saint Martins is a city in Cole County, Missouri, United States. The population was 1,191 at the 2020 census. It is part of the Jefferson City, Missouri Metropolitan Statistical Area.

== Geography ==
St. Martins is located at 38°35′41″N 92°20′13″W (38.594677, -92.336962).

According to the United States Census Bureau, the city has a total area of 1.90 square miles (4.92 km^{2}), of which 1.89 square miles (4.90 km^{2}) is land and 0.01 square miles (0.03 km^{2}) is water.

== Demographics ==
Historical population
Census	Pop.	Note	%±
1980	739		—
1990	717		−3.0%
2000	1,023		42.7%
2010	1,140		11.4%
2020	1,191		4.5%
U.S. Decennial Census

=== 2010 census ===
As of the census of 2010, there were 1,140 people, 451 households, and 325 families living in the city. The population density was 603.2 inhabitants per square mile (232.9/km^{2}). There were 474 housing units at an average density of 250.8 per square mile (96.8/km^{2}). The racial makeup of the city was 95.4% White, 1.1% African American, 0.3% Native American, 0.7% Asian, 1.0% from other races, and 1.6% from two or more races. Hispanic or Latino of any race were 1.2% of the population.

There were 451 households, of which 36.6% had children under the age of 18 living with them, 57.9% were married couples living together, 11.3% had a female householder with no husband present, 2.9% had a male householder with no wife present, and 27.9% were non-families. 23.7% of all households were made up of individuals, and 11.3% had someone living alone who was 65 years of age or older. The average household size was 2.53 and the average family size was 2.97.

The median age in the city was 36.6 years. 25.9% of residents were under the age of 18; 7.9% were between the ages of 18 and 24; 27.2% were from 25 to 44; 25.9% were from 45 to 64; and 13% were 65 years of age or older. The gender makeup of the city was 47.0% male and 53.0% female.

=== 2000 census ===
As of the census of 2000, there were 1,023 people, 391 households, and 276 families living in the city. The population density was 643.8 people per square mile (248.6 people/km^{2}). There were 398 housing units at an average density of 250.5 per square mile (96.7/km^{2}). The racial makeup of the city was 97.36% White, 0.88% African American, 0.20% Native American, 0.20% Asian, 0.78% from other races, and 0.59% from two or more races. Hispanic or Latino of any race were 1.27% of the population.

There were 391 households, out of which 41.9% had children under the age of 18 living with them, 57.5% were married couples living together, 9.7% had a female householder with no husband present, and 29.2% were non-families. 27.4% of all households were made up of individuals, and 9.7% had someone living alone who was 65 years of age or older. The average household size was 2.62 and the average family size was 3.16.

In the city, the population was spread out, with 30.3% under the age of 18, 8.5% from 18 to 24, 29.2% from 25 to 44, 22.8% from 45 to 64, and 9.2% who were 65 years of age or older. The median age was 33 years. For every 100 females, there were 88.1 males. For every 100 females age 18 and over, there were 88.1 males.

The median income for a household in the city was $41,389, and the median income for a family was $52,917. Males had a median income of $31,484 versus $22,262 for females. The per capita income for the city was $23,900. About 6.0% of families and 8.8% of the population were below the poverty line, including 11.7% of those under age 18 and 4.4% of those age 65 or over.

== Education ==
It is within the Jefferson City Public Schools school district.

St. Martin Catholic Parish is a private Catholic school, serving grades PK-8. The school offers the following sports:

- Archery
- Basketball
- Cross Country
- Track and Field
- Volleyball
