= Dale, West Virginia =

Unincorporated community in West Virginia, United States

Dale
- Unincorporated community
- Location within the state of West Virginia
- Coordinates: 39°27′28″N 80°39′01″W
- Country: United States
- State: West Virginia
- County: Tyler
- Elevation: 902 ft (275 m)
- Time zone: UTC-5 (Eastern (EST))
  - Summer (DST): UTC-4 (EDT)
- GNIS feature ID: 1537961

Dale is an unincorporated community in Tyler County, in the U.S. state of West Virginia.

== History ==
A post office called Dale was established in 1889, and remained in operation until 1951. The origin of the name Dale is obscure.
