= Braden, West Virginia =

Unincorporated community in West Virginia, United States

- Unincorporated community
- Location within West Virginia Location within the United States
- Coordinates: 39°26′25″N 80°44′38″W
- Country: United States
- State: West Virginia
- County: Tyler
- Elevation: 768 ft (234 m)
- Time zone: UTC-5 (Eastern (EST))
  - Summer (DST): UTC-4 (EDT)
- Area codes: 304 & 681
- GNIS feature ID: 1553958

Braden (also known as Lima) is an unincorporated community in Tyler County, West Virginia, United States. Braden is located on Indian Creek and County Route 13, 9.3 miles (15.0 km) east-southeast of Middlebourne.

The community has the name of Glenn Braden, a business official.
