= Stringtown, Tucker County, West Virginia =

Stringtown, West Virginia
- Ghost town
- Location within West Virginia
- Coordinates: 38°59′20″N 79°28′25″W
- Country: United States
- State: West Virginia
- County: Tucker
- Elevation: 2,861 ft (872 m)
- GNIS feature ID: 1689416

Stringtown is a ghost town in Tucker County, West Virginia, United States. Stringtown was located at what is now the junction of West Virginia Route 32 and West Virginia Route 72, 9.7 miles (15.6 km) south of Davis.
