= Stringtown, Cole County, Missouri =

Unincorporated community in Missouri, U.S.

Coordinates: 38°31′22″N 92°21′15″W

Stringtown is an unincorporated community in Cole County, in the U.S. state of Missouri.

== History ==
A post office called Stingtown was established in 1851, and remained in operation until 1882. The community was so named for the manner in which two stores were strung out near the original town site.
