= St. Thomas, Missouri =

City in Cole County, Missouri, United States

- City
- City of St. Thomas
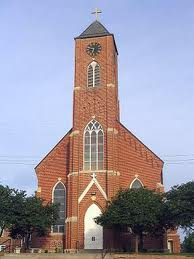
- St. Thomas the Apostle Catholic Church in St. Thomas

- Location of St. Thomas, Missouri
- Coordinates: 38°22′16″N 92°13′6″W
- Country: United States
- State: Missouri
- County: Cole
- Township: Osage
- Incorporated: 1855
- Named for: Thomas the Apostle

Government
  - Mayor: Darrel Buechter

Area
  - Total: 0.98 sq mi (2.53 km^{2})
  - Land: 0.98 sq mi (2.53 km^{2})
  - Water: 0 sq mi (0.00 km^{2})
- Elevation: 784 ft (239 m)

Population (2020)
  - Total: 222
  - Estimate (2024): 226
  - Density: 226.8/sq mi (87.58/km^{2})
- Time zone: UTC-6 (Central (CST))
  - Summer (DST): UTC-5 (CDT)
- ZIP code: 65076
- Area code: 573
- FIPS code: 29-65162
- GNIS feature ID: 2396901

St. Thomas is a city in Cole County, Missouri, United States. The population was 222 at the 2020 census. It is part of the Jefferson City, Missouri Metropolitan Statistical Area.

== History ==
A post office called Saint Thomas has been in operation since 1855. The city was named after Thomas the Apostle.

== Geography ==
St. Thomas is located at 38°22′16″N 92°13′6″W (38.371163, -92.218221).

According to the United States Census Bureau, the city has a total area of 0.98 square miles (2.54 km^{2}), all land.

== Demographics ==
Historical population
Census	Pop.	Note	%±
1880	110		—
1970	195		—
1980	337		72.8%
1990	263		−22.0%
2000	287		9.1%
2010	263		−8.4%
2020	220		−16.3%
U.S. Decennial Census

=== 2010 census ===
At the 2010 census there were 263 people in 95 households, including 71 families, in the city. The population density was 268.4 inhabitants per square mile (103.6/km^{2}). There were 100 housing units at an average density of 102.0 per square mile (39.4/km^{2}). The racial makup of the city was 99.2% White, 0.4% African American, and 0.4% from two or more races.

Of the 95 households 45.3% had children under the age of 18 living with them, 63.2% were married couples living together, 8.4% had a female householder with no husband present, 3.2% had a male householder with no wife present, and 25.3% were non-families. 25.3% of households were one person and 12.6% were one person aged 65 or older. The average household size was 2.77 and the average family size was 3.34.

The median age was 32.6 years. 31.6% of residents were under the age of 18; 7.1% were between the ages of 18 and 24; 31.9% were from 25 to 44; 19.4% were from 45 to 64; and 9.9% were 65 or older. The gender makeup of the city was 47.1% male and 52.9% female.

=== 2000 census ===
As of the census of 2000, there were 263 people and 95 households. The population density was 222.9 inhabitants per square mile (86.1/km^{2}). There were 100 housing units at an average density of 83.3 per square mile (32.2/km^{2}). The racial makup of the town was 99.24% White and 0.38% African American.

Of the 95 households 45.3% had children under the age of 18 living with them, 65.7% were married couples living together, 11.8% had a female householder with no husband present, and 21.6% were non-families. 17.6% of households were one person and 12.7% were one person aged 65 or older. The average household size was 2.81 and the average family size was 3.21.

The age distribution was 25.4% under the age of 18, 14.3% from 18 to 24, 31.4% from 25 to 44, 15.0% from 45 to 64, and 13.9% 65 or older. The median age was 30 years. For every 100 females, there were 88.8 males. For every 100 females age 18 and over, there were 87.7 males.

The median household income was $43,571 and the median family income was $44,250. Males had a median income of $26,806 versus $19,688 for females. The per capita income for the town was $18,134. About 5.9% of families and 6.2% of the population were below the poverty line, including 9.0% of those under the age of eighteen and 11.3% of those sixty five or over.

== Education ==
It is in the Blair Oaks R-II School District.

== See also ==
- List of cities in Missouri
