= Centertown, Missouri =

- Village
- Village of Centertown
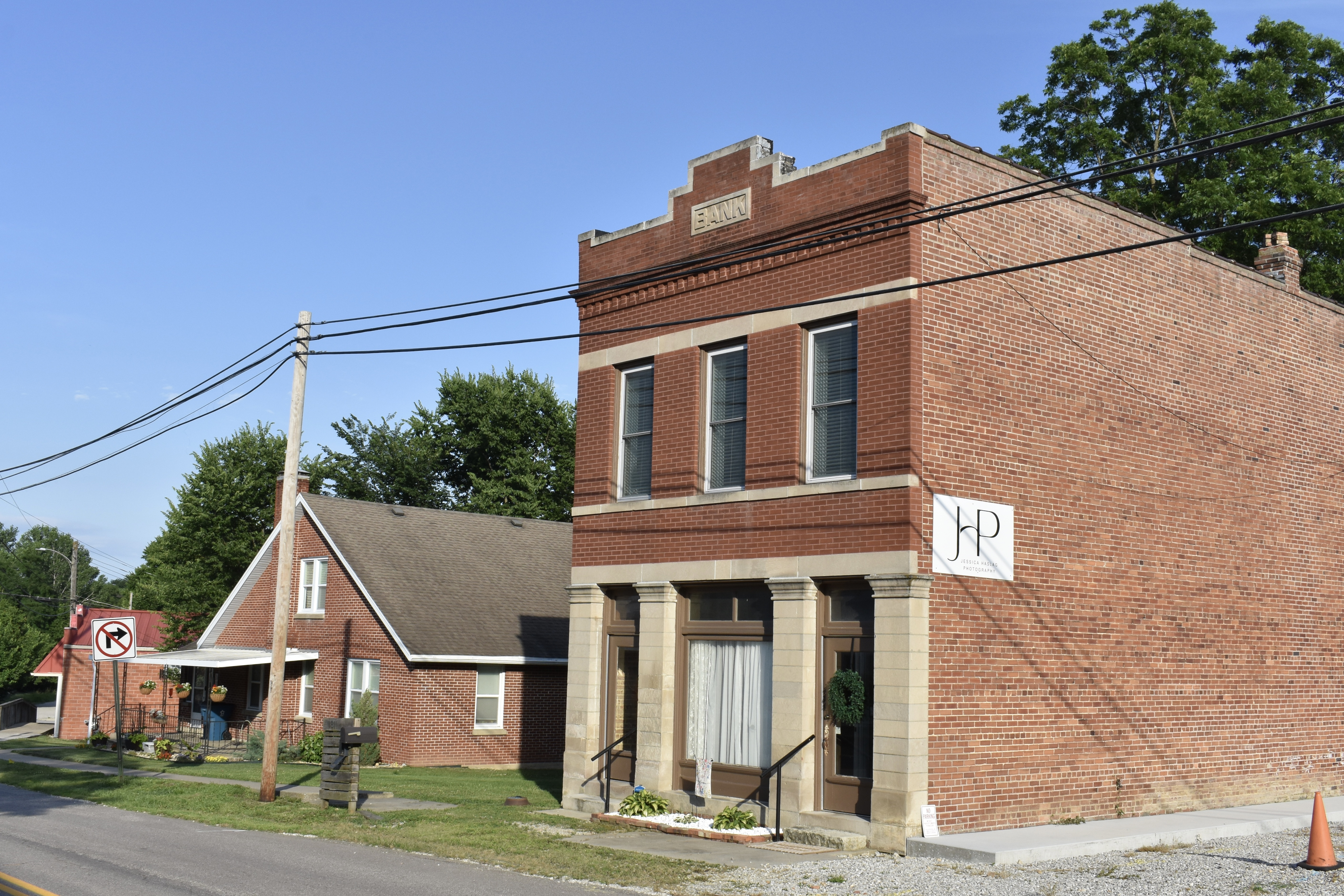
- Centertown in June 2026

- Location of Centertown, Missouri
- Coordinates: 38°37′9″N 92°24′32″W
- Country: United States
- State: Missouri
- County: Cole
- Founded: 1867

Area
  - Total: 0.95 sq mi (2.45 km^{2})
  - Land: 0.95 sq mi (2.45 km^{2})
  - Water: 0 sq mi (0.00 km^{2})
- Elevation: 810 ft (250 m)

Population (2020)
  - Total: 284
  - Density: 300/sq mi (115.7/km^{2})
- Time zone: UTC-6 (Central (CST))
  - Summer (DST): UTC-5 (CDT)
- ZIP code: 65023
- Area code: 573
- FIPS code: 29-12664
- GNIS feature ID: 2396636
- Website: centertownmo.org

Centertown is a village in Cole County, Missouri, United States. The population was 284 at the 2020 census. It is part of the Jefferson City, Missouri Metropolitan Statistical Area.

== History ==
Centertown was platted in 1867. The village was named from its location near Missouri's geographic center. A post office has been in operation at Centertown since 1867.

The Garnett Farm Historic District was listed on the National Register of Historic Places in 2016.

== Geography ==
Centertown is located on U.S. Route 50, approximately 14 mi (23 km) northwest of Jefferson City.

According to the United States Census Bureau, the village has a total area of 0.95 square miles (2.46 km^{2}), all land.

== Demographics ==
Historical population
Census	Pop.	Note	%±
1880	154		—
1910	285		—
1920	243		−14.7%
1930	259		6.6%
1940	271		4.6%
1950	248		−8.5%
1960	190		−23.4%
1970	277		45.8%
1980	304		9.7%
1990	356		17.1%
2000	257		−27.8%
2010	278		8.2%
2020	284		2.2%
U.S. Decennial Census

=== 2010 census ===
As of the census of 2010, there were 278 people, 128 households, and 77 families residing in the village. The population density was 292.6 inhabitants per square mile (113.0/km^{2}). There were 151 housing units at an average density of 158.9 per square mile (61.4/km^{2}). The racial makeup of the village was 97.1% White, 0.7% African American, 0.4% Asian, 0.4% from other races, and 1.4% from two or more races. Hispanic or Latino of any race were 0.7% of the population.

There were 128 households, of which 24.2% had children under the age of 18 living with them, 47.7% were married couples living together, 9.4% had a female householder with no husband present, 3.1% had a male householder with no wife present, and 39.8% were non-families. 32.0% of all households were made up of individuals, and 14.9% had someone living alone who was 65 years of age or older. The average household size was 2.17 and the average family size was 2.75.

The median age in the village was 45.1 years. 19.1% of residents were under the age of 18; 10.1% were between the ages of 18 and 24; 20.6% were from 25 to 44; 29.8% were from 45 to 64; and 20.5% were 65 years of age or older. The gender makeup of the village was 47.5% male and 52.5% female.

=== 2000 census ===
As of the census of 2000, there were 257 people, 117 households, and 73 families residing in the town. The population density was 285.4 inhabitants per square mile (110.2/km^{2}). There were 132 housing units at an average density of 146.6 per square mile (56.6/km^{2}). The racial makeup of the town was 99.22% White, 0.39% Native American and 0.39% Asian.

There were 117 households, out of which 29.1% had children under the age of 18 living with them, 49.6% were married couples living together, 11.1% had a female householder with no husband present, and 36.8% were non-families. 34.2% of all households were made up of individuals, and 12.8% had someone living alone who was 65 years of age or older. The average household size was 2.20 and the average family size was 2.78.

In the town the population was spread out, with 22.6% under the age of 18, 5.8% from 18 to 24, 34.2% from 25 to 44, 21.4% from 45 to 64, and 16.0% who were 65 years of age or older. The median age was 39 years. For every 100 females, there were 96.2 males. For every 100 females age 18 and over, there were 99.0 males.

The median income for a household in the town was $39,750, and the median income for a family was $47,417. Males had a median income of $26,591 versus $20,769 for females. The per capita income for the town was $17,321. About 2.2% of families and 3.7% of the population were below the poverty line, including 1.8% of those under the age of eighteen and 8.9% of those 65 or over.

== Education ==
It is within the Jefferson City Public Schools school district.
