= Blue, West Virginia =

Unincorporated community in West Virginia, United States

Blue
- Unincorporated community
- Location within the state of West Virginia Blue (the United States)
- Coordinates: 39°26′51″N 80°49′31″W
- Country: United States
- State: West Virginia
- County: Tyler
- Elevation: 702 ft (214 m)
- Time zone: UTC-5 (Eastern (EST))
  - Summer (DST): UTC-4 (EDT)
- GNIS ID: 1549599

Blue is an unincorporated community in Tyler County, West Virginia, United States. Its post office is closed in 1935.
