= Grays Creek (Yadkin River tributary) =

Stream in North Carolina, USA

Grays Creek Tributary to Yadkin River
- Location of Grays Creek mouth Grays Creek (Yadkin River tributary) (the United States)

Location
- Country: United States
- State: North Carolina
- County: Wilkes

Physical characteristics
- Source: North Little Hunting Creek divide
  - location: about 0.5 miles northeast of Dark Mountain
  - coordinates: 36°08′59″N 080°57′31″W
  - elevation: 1,300 ft (400 m)
- Mouth: Yadkin River
  - location: about 1 mile southwest of Ronda, North Carolina.
  - coordinates: 36°12′08″N 080°57′15″W
  - elevation: 898 ft (274 m)
- Length: 5.24 mi (8.43 km)
- Basin size: 4.90 square miles (12.7 km^{2})
- Discharge
  - location: Yadkin River
  - average: 7.84 cu ft/s (0.222 m^{3}/s) at mouth with Yadkin River

Basin features
- Progression: generally north
- River system: Yadkin River
- Tributaries
  - left: unnamed tributaries
  - right: unnamed tributaries
- Bridges: Old US 421, Wilkes-Yadkin Road, US 421, Mathis Mill Road, Old 60

Grays Creek is a 5.24 mi (8.43 km) long 2nd order tributary to the Yadkin River in Wilkes County, North Carolina.

== Course ==
Grays Creek rises about 0.5 miles northeast of Dark Mountain and then flows northerly to join the Yadkin River at about 1 mile southwest of Ronda, North Carolina.

== Watershed ==
Grays Creek drains 4.90 square miles (12.7 km^{2}) of area, receives about 49.9 in/year of precipitation, has a wetness index of 355.77, and is about 48% forested.
