= Wardsville, Missouri =

Village in Cole County, Missouri, United States

- Village
- Village of Wardsville
- Location of Wardsville, Missouri
- Coordinates: 38°29′25″N 92°10′44″W
- Country: United States
- State: Missouri
- County: Cole
- Incorporated: 1881
- Named for: Junius Ward

Area
  - Total: 3.47 sq mi (8.99 km^{2})
  - Land: 3.47 sq mi (8.99 km^{2})
  - Water: 0 sq mi (0.00 km^{2})
- Elevation: 732 ft (223 m)

Population (2020)
  - Total: 1,599
  - Estimate (2024): 1,642
  - Density: 460.8/sq mi (177.91/km^{2})
- Time zone: UTC-6 (Central (CST))
  - Summer (DST): UTC-5 (CDT)
- ZIP code: 65101
- Area code: 573
- FIPS code: 29-77002
- GNIS feature ID: 2400093
- Website: wardsville.org

Wardsville is a village in Cole County, Missouri, United States. The population was 1,599 at the 2020 census. It is part of the Jefferson City, Missouri Metropolitan Statistical Area.

== History ==
A post office called Wardsville was established in 1881, and remained in operation until 1933. The village was named after Junius Ward, the original owner of the town site.

== Geography ==
According to the United States Census Bureau, the village has a total area of 3.47 square miles (8.99 km^{2}), all land.

== Demographics ==
Historical population
| Census | Pop. | Note | %± |
|---|---|---|---|
| 1970 | 460 | | — |
| 1980 | 535 | | 16.3% |
| 1990 | 513 | | −4.1% |
| 2000 | 976 | | 90.3% |
| 2010 | 1,506 | | 54.3% |
| 2020 | 1,599 | | 6.2% |
U.S. Decennial Census

=== 2020 census ===
As of the 2020 census, Wardsville had a population of 1,599. The median age was 38.2 years. 29.6% of residents were under the age of 18 and 12.9% of residents were 65 years of age or older. For every 100 females there were 87.0 males, and for every 100 females age 18 and over there were 87.2 males age 18 and over.

0.0% of residents lived in urban areas, while 100.0% lived in rural areas.

There were 563 households in Wardsville, of which 45.8% had children under the age of 18 living in them. Of all households, 64.7% were married-couple households, 8.5% were households with a male householder and no spouse or partner present, and 22.2% were households with a female householder and no spouse or partner present. About 16.5% of all households were made up of individuals and 8.5% had someone living alone who was 65 years of age or older.

There were 594 housing units, of which 5.2% were vacant. The homeowner vacancy rate was 0.6% and the rental vacancy rate was 9.6%.

Racial composition as of the 2020 census
| Race | Number | Percent |
|---|---|---|
| White | 1,503 | 94.0% |
| Black or African American | 15 | 0.9% |
| American Indian and Alaska Native | 2 | 0.1% |
| Asian | 4 | 0.3% |
| Native Hawaiian and Other Pacific Islander | 1 | 0.1% |
| Some other race | 6 | 0.4% |
| Two or more races | 68 | 4.3% |
| Hispanic or Latino (of any race) | 20 | 1.3% |

=== 2010 census ===
As of the census of 2010, there were 1,506 people, 516 households, and 416 families living in the village. The population density was 434.0 inhabitants per square mile (167.6/km^{2}). There were 529 housing units at an average density of 152.4 per square mile (58.8/km^{2}). The racial makeup of the village was 97.7% White, 0.6% African American, 0.3% Native American, 0.3% Asian, 0.3% Pacific Islander, and 0.8% from two or more races. Hispanic or Latino of any race were 0.5% of the population.

There were 516 households, of which 49.8% had children under the age of 18 living with them, 66.5% were married couples living together, 9.9% had a female householder with no husband present, 4.3% had a male householder with no wife present, and 19.4% were non-families. 16.9% of all households were made up of individuals, and 8% had someone living alone who was 65 years of age or older. The average household size was 2.92 and the average family size was 3.28.

The median age in the village was 35.3 years. 33% of residents were under the age of 18; 6.8% were between the ages of 18 and 24; 26.2% were from 25 to 44; 24.7% were from 45 to 64; and 9.4% were 65 years of age or older. The gender makeup of the village was 48.5% male and 51.5% female.

=== 2000 census ===
As of the census of 2000, there were 976 people, 343 households, and 276 families living in the village. The population density was 402.4 inhabitants per square mile (155.4/km^{2}). There were 347 housing units at an average density of 143.1 per square mile (55.3/km^{2}). The racial makeup of the village was 99.59% White, 0.10% Native American, and 0.31% from two or more races. Hispanic or Latino of any race were 0.31% of the population.

There were 343 households, out of which 45.5% had children under the age of 18 living with them, 72.0% were married couples living together, 6.4% had a female householder with no husband present, and 19.5% were non-families. 17.5% of all households were made up of individuals, and 8.5% had someone living alone who was 65 years of age or older. The average household size was 2.85 and the average family size was 3.23.

In the village, the population was spread out, with 31.4% under the age of 18, 6.4% from 18 to 24, 30.9% from 25 to 44, 21.3% from 45 to 64, and 10.0% who were 65 years of age or older. The median age was 35 years. For every 100 females, there were 97.6 males. For every 100 females age 18 and over, there were 96.5 males.

The median income for a household in the village was $57,813, and the median income for a family was $62,188. Males had a median income of $37,361 versus $28,482 for females. The per capita income for the village was $21,925. About 1.5% of families and 1.9% of the population were below the poverty line, including 1.0% of those under age 18 and 5.4% of those age 65 or over.

== Education ==
It is in the Blair Oaks R-II School District.

== See also ==
- List of cities in Missouri
