= Stringtown, Roane County, West Virginia =

Stringtown, West Virginia
- Ghost town
- Location within West Virginia Location within the United States
- Coordinates: 38°40′06″N 81°20′21″W
- Country: United States
- State: West Virginia
- County: Roane
- Elevation: 732 ft (223 m)
- Time zone: UTC-5 (Eastern (EST))
  - Summer (DST): UTC-4 (EDT)
- Area codes: 304 & 681
- GNIS feature ID: 1549941

Stringtown is an unincorporated community in Roane County, West Virginia, United States. Stringtown is located on County Route 52, 9.25 miles (14.89 km) south of Spencer.
