= Elston, Missouri =

Unincorporated community in the US state of Missouri

Coordinates: 38°36′46″N 92°19′26″W

Elston is an unincorporated community in Cole County, Missouri, United States. It is located near the western boundaries of Jefferson City.

Elston was laid out in 1867, and named after A. M. Elston, a state politician. A post office called Elston Station was established in 1858, the name was changed to Elston in 1877, and the post office closed in 1972.
