= Stringtown, Tyler County, West Virginia =

Stringtown, West Virginia
- Unincorporated community
- Location within West Virginia Location within the United States
- Coordinates: 39°26′43″N 80°41′53″W
- Country: United States
- State: West Virginia
- County: Tyler
- Elevation: 810 ft (250 m)
- Time zone: UTC-5 (Eastern (EST))
  - Summer (DST): UTC-4 (EDT)
- Area codes: 304 & 681
- GNIS feature ID: 1555730

Alvy, also known as Stringtown, from the oil boom days of c. 1890s–1910) is an unincorporated community in Tyler County, West Virginia, United States. Alvy is located along County Route 13 (a.k.a. Indian Creek Road) and Indian Creek, 16 miles (26 km) east-southeast of Middlebourne. The alternate name of Stringtown came about because the estimated population of 5,000 residents, as well as temporary workers, were strung over the hills and hollows, hence the nickname. Alvy was once Moore, Virginia, and changed to Alvy c. 1850. The town had a post office, which closed on February 1, 1997; the post office used the name Alvy.
