= Cole County, Missouri =

County in Missouri, United States

- County
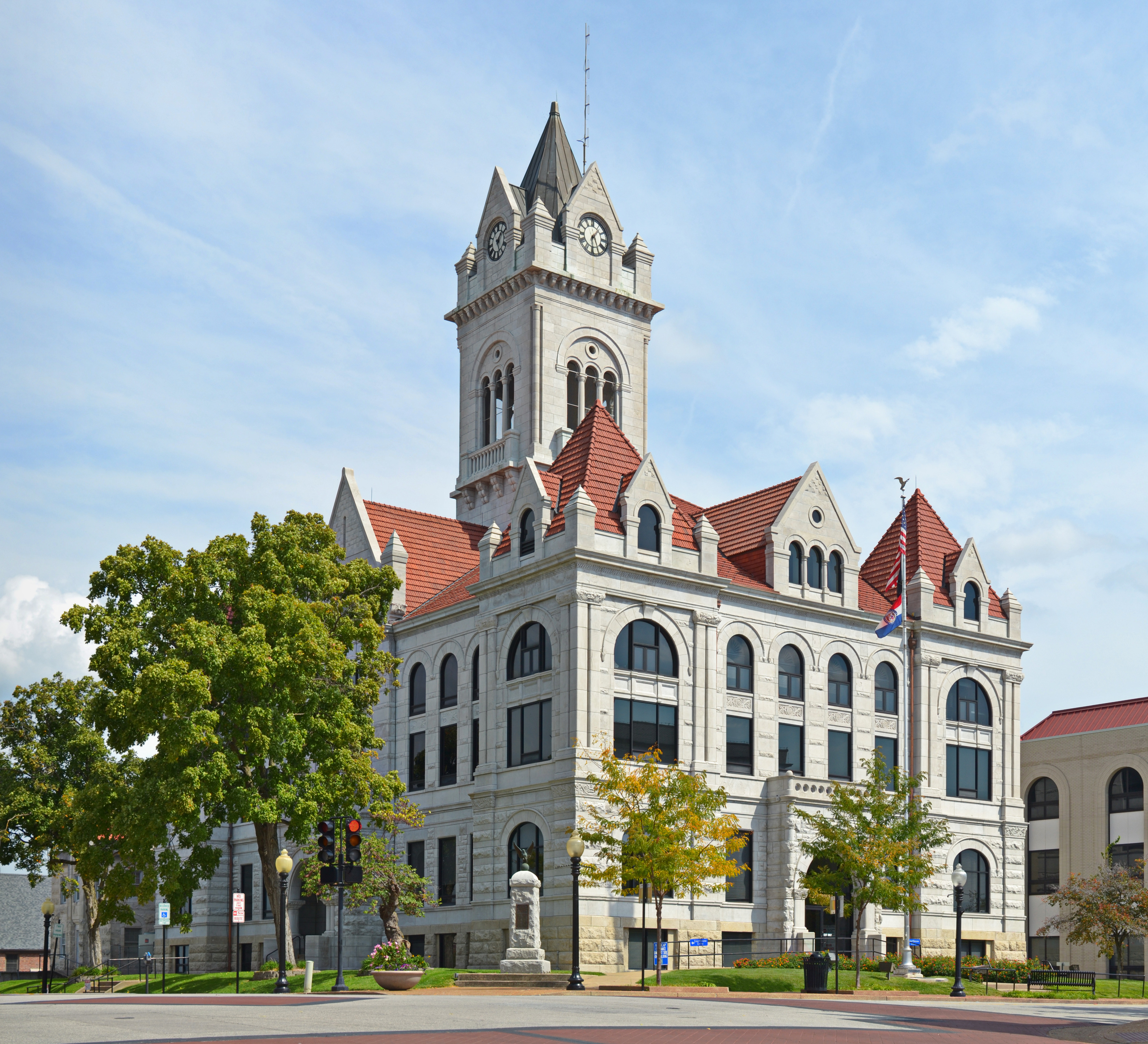
- The Cole County Courthouse in Jefferson City

- Seal

- Location within the U.S. state of Missouri
- Coordinates: 38°31′N 92°17′W
- Country: United States
- State: Missouri
- Founded: 1820
- Named for: William Temple Cole
- Seat: Jefferson City
- Largest city: Jefferson City

Area
  - Total: 402 sq mi (1,040 km^{2})
  - Land: 394 sq mi (1,020 km^{2})
  - Water: 8.2 sq mi (21 km^{2}) 2.0%

Population (2020)
  - Total: 77,279
  - Estimate (2025): 77,908 ▲
  - Density: 196/sq mi (75.7/km^{2})
- Time zone: UTC−6 (Central)
  - Summer (DST): UTC−5 (CDT)
- Congressional district: 3rd
- Website: www.colecounty.org

Cole County is located in the central part of the U.S. state of Missouri. As of the 2020 census, its population was 77,279. Its county seat and most populous city is Jefferson City, the state capital. The county was organized November 16, 1820, and named after pioneer William Temple Cole who built Cole's Fort in Boonville.

Cole County is in the Jefferson City, MO Metropolitan Statistical Area. It is south of the Missouri River.

In 2010, the center of the population of Missouri was in Cole County, near the village of Wardsville.

== Geography ==
According to the U.S. Census Bureau, the county has a total area of 402 square miles (1,040 km^{2}), of which 394 square miles (1,020 km^{2}) is land and 8.2 square miles (21 km^{2}) (2.0%) is water. It is the third-smallest county in Missouri by area.

=== Adjacent counties ===
- Boone County (north)
- Callaway County (northeast)
- Osage County (southeast)
- Miller County (southwest)
- Moniteau County (northwest)

=== Major highways ===
- U.S. Route 50
- U.S. Route 54
- U.S. Route 63
- Route 17
- Route 179

== Demographics ==
Historical population
Census	Pop.	Note	%±
1830	3,023		—
1840	9,286		207.2%
1850	6,696		−27.9%
1860	9,697		44.8%
1870	10,292		6.1%
1880	15,515		50.7%
1890	17,281		11.4%
1900	20,578		19.1%
1910	21,957		6.7%
1920	24,680		12.4%
1930	30,848		25.0%
1940	34,912		13.2%
1950	35,464		1.6%
1960	40,761		14.9%
1970	46,228		13.4%
1980	56,663		22.6%
1990	63,579		12.2%
2000	71,397		12.3%
2010	75,990		6.4%
2020	77,279		1.7%
2025 (est.)	77,908	▲	0.8%
U.S. Decennial Census; 1790-1960 1900-1990; 1990-2000 2010-2015

=== 2020 census ===
As of the 2020 census, the county had a population of 77,279. The median age was 39.8 years. 22.1% of residents were under the age of 18 and 17.4% of residents were 65 years of age or older. For every 100 females there were 102.9 males, and for every 100 females age 18 and over there were 101.8 males age 18 and over.

The racial makeup of the county was 80.5% White, 10.5% Black or African American, 0.3% American Indian and Alaska Native, 1.3% Asian, 0.1% Native Hawaiian and Pacific Islander, 1.3% from some other race, and 6.0% from two or more races. Hispanic or Latino residents of any race comprised 3.4% of the population.

65.7% of residents lived in urban areas, while 34.3% lived in rural areas.

There were 30,478 households in the county, of which 29.6% had children under the age of 18 living with them and 28.2% had a female householder with no spouse or partner present. About 30.7% of all households were made up of individuals and 12.2% had someone living alone who was 65 years of age or older.

There were 33,211 housing units, of which 8.2% were vacant. Among occupied housing units, 67.1% were owner-occupied and 32.9% were renter-occupied. The homeowner vacancy rate was 1.6% and the rental vacancy rate was 8.4%.

Cole County, Missouri – Racial and ethnic composition Note: the US Census treats Hispanic/Latino as an ethnic category. This table excludes Latinos from the racial categories and assigns them to a separate category. Hispanics/Latinos may be of any race.
Race / Ethnicity (NH = Non-Hispanic)	Pop 1980	Pop 1990	Pop 2000	Pop 2010	Pop 2020	% 1980	% 1990	% 2000	% 2010	% 2020
White alone (NH)	51,766	57,837	61,684	63,247	61,474	91.36%	90.97%	86.40%	83.23%	79.55%
Black or African American alone (NH)	4,203	4,776	7,049	8,421	8,041	7.42%	7.51%	9.87%	11.08%	10.41%
Native American or Alaska Native alone (NH)	77	226	219	214	175	0.14%	0.36%	0.31%	0.28%	0.23%
Asian alone (NH)	187	255	621	956	965	0.33%	0.40%	0.87%	1.26%	1.25%
Native Hawaiian or Pacific Islander alone (NH)	x	x	20	44	56	x	x	0.03%	0.06%	0.07%
Other race alone (NH)	132	38	65	69	305	0.23%	0.06%	0.09%	0.09%	0.39%
Mixed race or Multiracial (NH)	x	x	824	1,244	3,602	x	x	1.15%	1.64%	4.66%
Hispanic or Latino (any race)	298	447	915	1,795	2,661	0.53%	0.70%	1.28%	2.36%	3.44%
Total	56,663	63,579	71,397	75,990	77,279	100.00%	100.00%	100.00%	100.00%	100.00%

=== 2000 census ===
As of the census of 2000, there were 71,397 people, 27,040 households, and 17,927 families residing in the county. The population density was 182 inhabitants per square mile (70/km^{2}). There were 28,915 housing units at an average density of 74 units per square mile (29/km^{2}). The racial makeup of the county was 87.06% White, 9.92% Black or African American, 0.33% Native American, 0.88% Asian, 0.04% Pacific Islander, 0.54% from other races, and 1.23% from two or more races. Approximately 1.28% of the population were Hispanic or Latino of any race. 40.1% were of German, 13.6% American, 7.8% English and 6.9% Irish ancestry.

There were 27,040 households, out of which 33.60% had children under the age of 18 living with them, 53.00% were married couples living together, 10.00% had a female householder with no husband present, and 33.70% were non-families. 28.70% of all households were made up of individuals, and 9.30% had someone living alone who was 65 years of age or older. The average household size was 2.43 and the average family size was 3.00.

In the county, the population was spread out, with 24.20% under the age of 18, 9.80% from 18 to 24, 32.30% from 25 to 44, 22.40% from 45 to 64, and 11.30% who were 65 years of age or older. The median age was 36 years. For every 100 females, there were 105.60 males. For every 100 females age 18 and over, there were 106.50 males.

The median income for a household in the county was $42,924, and the median income for a family was $53,416. Males had a median income of $33,769 versus $25,189 for females. The per capita income for the county was $20,739. About 5.80% of families and 8.70% of the population were below the poverty line, including 11.50% of those under age 18 and 7.30% of those age 65 or over.

== Infrastructure ==
The Missouri Department of Corrections (MDOC) operates the Jefferson City Correctional Center in Jefferson City. The current JCCC was opened on September 15, 2004, replacing the Missouri State Penitentiary in Jefferson City.

== Education ==
School districts including sections of the county, no matter how slight, even if the relevant schools and/or administration buildings in another county:

- Blair Oaks R-II School District
- Cole County R-I School District
- Cole County R-V School District
- Jamestown C-1 School District
- Jefferson City Public Schools

=== Public schools ===
- Blair Oaks R-II School District – Jefferson City
  - Blair Oaks Elementary School (K-02)
  - Blair Oaks Intermediate School (03-05)
  - Blair Oaks Middle School (06-08)
  - Blair Oaks High School (09-12)
- Cole County R-I School District – Russellville
  - Cole County R-I Elementary School (PK-06)
  - Russellville Junior/Senior High School (07-12)
- Cole County R-V School District – Eugene
  - Eugene Elementary School (PK-06)
  - Eugene High School (07-12)
- Jefferson City Public School District – Jefferson City
  - Southwest Early Childhood Education Center (PK)
  - Callaway Hills Elementary School (K-05) – Holts Summit
  - South Elementary School (K-05)
  - Thorpe J. Gordon STEM Elementary School (K-05)
  - East Elementary School (K-05)
  - North Elementary School (K-05) – Holts Summit
  - Cedar Hill Elementary School (K-05)
  - West Elementary School (K-05)
  - Moreau Heights Elementary School (K-05)
  - Belair Elementary School (K-05)
  - Pioneer Trail Elementary School (K-05)
  - Clarence Lawson Elementary School (K-05)
  - Thomas Jefferson Middle School (06-08)
  - Lewis & Clark Middle School (06-08)
  - Jefferson City High School (09-12)
  - Capital City High School (09-12)

=== Private schools ===
- Immaculate Conception School – Jefferson City (PK-08) – Roman Catholic
- Immanuel Lutheran School – Jefferson City (PK-08) – Lutheran
- Moreau Montessori School – Jefferson City (PK-03) – Nonsectarian
- River Oak Christian Academy– Jefferson City (PK-08) – Nondenominational Christian
- St. Francis Xavier School – Taos (K-08) – Roman Catholic
- St. Joseph Cathedral School – Jefferson City (PK-08) – Roman Catholic
- St. Martin School – St. Martins (K-08) – Roman Catholic
- St. Peter Interparish School – Jefferson City (PK-08) – Roman Catholic
- St. Stanislaus Catholic School – Wardsville (K-08) – Roman Catholic
- St. Thomas The Apostle School – Saint Thomas (PK-08) – Roman Catholic
- Trinity Lutheran School – Jefferson City (PK-08) – Lutheran
- Calvary Lutheran High School – Jefferson City (09-12) – Lutheran
- Helias Catholic High School – Jefferson City (09-12) – Roman Catholic
- Lighthouse Preparatory Academy – Jefferson City (PK-12) – Nondenominational Christian

=== Post-secondary education ===
- Lincoln University – Jefferson City – A public, four-year historically black university.

=== Public libraries ===
- Missouri River Regional Library

== Communities ==
=== Cities ===
- Jefferson City (county seat and state capital; a small portion extends into Callaway County)
- Lohman
- Russellville
- St. Martins
- St. Thomas
- Taos

=== Villages ===
- Centertown
- Wardsville

=== Census-designated place ===
- Eugene

=== Unincorporated communities ===
- Apache Flats
- Bass
- Brazito
- Elston
- Henley
- Hickory Hill
- Honey Creek
- Marion
- Millbrook
- Osage Bend
- Osage Bluff
- Osage City
- Schubert
- Scott
- Scrivner
- Stringtown

== Government and politics ==
=== Political culture ===
Like many other counties in Mid-Missouri, Cole County is mostly Republican. The last Democrat to win the county in a presidential election was Harry S. Truman in 1948.

In 2004, state residents voted on a constitutional amendment to define marriage as the union between a man and a woman. This passed Cole County with 74.24% of the vote. The initiative passed the state with 71 percent of support from voters; Missouri became the first state to ban same-sex marriage.

=== Local ===
The Republican Party controls politics at the local level in Cole County. Republicans hold all but one of the elected positions in the county. The Democratic Party do not hold any elected positions on the county level.

Cole County, Missouri

Elected countywide officials
Assessor	Chris Estes	Republican
Circuit Clerk	Dawnel P. Davidson	Republican
County Clerk	Steve Korsmeyer	Republican
Collector	Larry Vincent	Republican
Commissioner (presiding)	Sam Bushman	Republican
Commissioner (district 1)	Jeff Hoelscher	Republican
Commissioner (district 2)	Harry Otto	Republican
Coroner	Carl R. Doerhoff	Independent
Prosecuting Attorney	Locke Thompson	Republican
Public Administrator	Ralph Jobe	Republican
Recorder	Judy Ridgeway	Republican
Sheriff	John P. Wheeler	Republican
Treasurer	Eric Peters	Republican

=== State ===
==== Gubernatorial ====
Past Gubernatorial Elections Results
Year	Republican	Democratic	Third Parties
2024	71.03% 28,418	26.67% 10,671	2.39% 917
2020	67.94% 26,886	29.63% 11,726	2.43% 961
2016	55.58% 20,872	42.09% 15,806	2.33% 877
2012	51.85% 19,099	45.64% 16,810	2.51% 926
2008	49.87% 19,285	48.98% 18,941	1.15% 447
2004	63.13% 23,147	36.08% 13,229	0.80% 292
2000	51.14% 16,673	47.23% 15,397	1.63% 532
1996	33.77% 9,902	63.80% 18,708	2.43% 713

==== Missouri House of Representatives ====
Cole County is divided into five legislative districts in the Missouri House of Representatives, all of which elected Republicans.

- District 49 — Travis Fitzwater (R-Holts Summit). Consists of a small unincorporated area of the county just west of the city of Jefferson City.

Missouri House of Representatives — District 49 — Cole County (2020)
Party	Candidate	Votes	%	±%
Republican	Travis Fitzwater	963	96.59%	

Missouri House of Representatives — District 49 — Cole County (2016)
Party	Candidate	Votes	%	±%
Republican	Travis Fitzwater	918	100.00%	+35.66

Missouri House of Representatives — District 49 — Cole County (2018)
Party	Candidate	Votes	%	±%
Republican	Travis Fitzwater	692	69.69%	
Democratic	Lisa Buhr	300	30.21%	

Missouri House of Representatives — District 49 — Cole County (2014)
Party	Candidate	Votes	%	±%
Republican	Travis Fitzwater	442	64.34%	−5.57
Democratic	Gracia Yancey Backer	245	35.66%	+5.57

Missouri House of Representatives — District 49 — Cole County (2012)
Party	Candidate	Votes	%	±%
Republican	Jeanie Riddle	704	69.91%	
Democratic	Pam Murray	303	30.09%	

- District 50 — Sara Walsh. Consists of unincorporated areas in the northwest corner of the county.

Missouri House of Representatives — District 50 — Cole County (2020)
Party	Candidate	Votes	%	±%
Republican	Sara Walsh	691	81.29%	
Democratic	Kari Chesney	159	18.71%	

Missouri House of Representatives — District 50 — Cole County (2018)
Party	Candidate	Votes	%	±%
Republican	Sara Walsh	536	76.90%	
Democratic	Michela Skelton	161	23.10%	

Missouri House of Representatives — District 50 — Cole County (2016)
Party	Candidate	Votes	%	±%
Republican	Caleb Jones	684	100.00%	

Missouri House of Representatives — District 50 — Cole County (2014)
Party	Candidate	Votes	%	±%
Republican	Caleb Jones	426	100.00%	0.00

Missouri House of Representatives — District 50 — Cole County (2012)
Party	Candidate	Votes	%	±%
Republican	Caleb Jones	611	100.00%	

- District 59 — Rudy Veit (R-Jefferson City). Consists of the communities of Centertown, Eugene, Lohman, Russellville, St. Martins, Taos, and Wardsville.

Missouri House of Representatives — District 59 — Cole County (2022)
Party	Candidate	Votes	%	±%
Republican	Rudy Viet	13,613	100.00%	

Missouri House of Representatives — District 59 — Cole County (2020)
Party	Candidate	Votes	%	±%
Republican	Rudy Veit	15,592	98.27%	

Missouri House of Representatives — District 59 — Cole County (2018)
Party	Candidate	Votes	%	±%
Republican	Rudy Veit	11,226	76.05%	
Democratic	Linda Ellen Greeson	3,518	23.83%	

Missouri House of Representatives — District 59 — Cole County (2016)
Party	Candidate	Votes	%	±%
Republican	Mike Bernskoetter	14,923	100.00%	

Missouri House of Representatives — District 59 — Cole County (2014)
Party	Candidate	Votes	%	±%
Republican	Mike Bernskoetter	8,396	88.59%	+7.84
Constitution	Michael Eberle	1,081	11.41%	+11.41

Missouri House of Representatives — District 59 — Cole County (2012)
Party	Candidate	Votes	%	±%
Republican	Mike Bernskoetter	12,604	80.75%	
Democratic	Vonnieta Trickey	3,005	19.25%	

- District 60 — Dave Griffith (R-Jefferson City) Consists of the city of Jefferson City.

Missouri House of Representatives — District 60 — Cole County (2022)
Party	Candidate	Votes	%	±%
Republican	Dave Griffith	7,577	62.20%	
Democratic	J. Don Salcedo	4,605	37.80%	

Missouri House of Representatives — District 60 — Cole County (2020)
Party	Candidate	Votes	%	±%
Republican	Dave Griffith	11,404	63.66%	
Democratic	Joshua Dunne	6,483	36.19%	

Missouri House of Representatives — District 60 — Cole County (2018)
Party	Candidate	Votes	%	±%
Republican	Dave Griffith	8,944	57.57%	
Democratic	Sara Michael	6,572	42.30%	

Missouri House of Representatives — District 60 — Cole County (2016)
Party	Candidate	Votes	%	±%
Republican	Jason (Jay) Barnes	11,139	64.24%	−35.76
Democratic	Kevin Nelson	6,202	35.76%	

Missouri House of Representatives — District 60 — Cole County (2014)
Party	Candidate	Votes	%	±%
Republican	Jason (Jay) Barnes	9,041	100.00%	−39.89

Missouri House of Representatives — District 60 — Cole County (2012)
Party	Candidate	Votes	%	±%
Republican	Jason (Jay) Barnes	10,674	60.11%	
Democratic	Thomas Minihan	7.084	39.89%	

- District 62 — Tom Hurst (R-Meta) Consists of the community of St. Thomas.

Missouri House of Representatives — District 62 — Cole County (2020)
Party	Candidate	Votes	%	±%
Republican	Bruce Sassmann	955	83.63%	
Democratic	Nancy Ragan	187	16.37%	

Missouri House of Representatives — District 62 — Cole County (2018)
Party	Candidate	Votes	%	±%
Republican	Tom Hurst	774	83.50%	
Democratic	Ashley Fajkowski	153	16.50%	

Missouri House of Representatives — District 62 — Cole County (2016)
Party	Candidate	Votes	%	±%
Republican	Tom Hurst	991	100.00%	

Missouri House of Representatives — District 62 — Cole County (2014)
Party	Candidate	Votes	%	±%
Republican	Tom Hurst	592	100.00%	−25.51

Missouri House of Representatives — District 62 — Cole County (2012)
Party	Candidate	Votes	%	±%
Republican	Tom Hurst	765	74.49%	
Democratic	Greg Stratman	262	25.51%	

==== Missouri Senate ====
Cole County is a part of Missouri's 6th District in the Missouri Senate and is currently represented by Mike Bernskoetter (R-Jefferson City).

Missouri Senate — District 6 — Cole County (2022)
Party	Candidate	Votes	%	±%
Republican	Mike Bernskoetter	23,302	100.00%	

Missouri Senate — District 6 — Cole County (2018)
Party	Candidate	Votes	%	±%
Republican	Mike Bernskoetter	23,058	69.49%	
Democratic	Nicole Thompson	9,473	28.55%	
Libertarian	Steven Wilson	625	1.88%	

Missouri Senate — District 6 — Cole County (2014)
Party	Candidate	Votes	%	±%
Republican	Mike Kehoe	17,157	75.64%	
Democratic	Mollie Kristen Freebairn	5,526	24.36%	

=== Federal ===
==== US Senate ====
U.S. Senate — Missouri — (2018)
Party	Candidate	Votes	%	±%
Republican	Josh Hawley	20,738	61.95%	
Democratic	Claire McCaskill	11,718	35.01%	
Independent	Craig O'Dear	448	1.34%	
Libertarian	Japheth Campbell	380	1.14%	
Green	Jo Crain	158	0.47%	

U.S. Senate — Missouri — (2016)
Party	Candidate	Votes	%	±%
Republican	Roy Blunt	21,940	58.54%	+6.77
Democratic	Jason Kander	14,216	37.93%	−4.19
Libertarian	Jonathan Dine	800	2.13%	−3.98
Green	Johnathan McFarland	311	0.83%	+0.83
Constitution	Fred Ryman	206	0.55%	+0.55
Write-In	Patrick Lee	3	0.01%	+0.01

U.S. Senate — Missouri — (2012)
Party	Candidate	Votes	%	±%
Republican	Todd Akin	18,918	51.77	
Democratic	Claire McCaskill	15,394	42.12	
Libertarian	Jonathan Dine	2,233	6.11	

==== US House of Representatives ====
All of Cole County is included in Missouri's 3rd congressional district and is currently represented by Blaine Luetkemeyer (R-Saint Elizabeth) in the U.S. House of Representatives.

U.S. House of Representatives — Missouri's 3rd Congressional District — Cole County (2022)
Party	Candidate	Votes	%	±%
Republican	Blaine Luetkemeyer	20,116	70.79%	
Democratic	Bethany Mann	8,203	29.21%	

U.S. House of Representatives — Missouri's 3rd Congressional District — Cole County (2020)
Party	Candidate	Votes	%	±%
Republican	Blaine Luetkemeyer	27,676	70.78%	
Democratic	Megan Rezabek	10,385	26.56%	
Libertarian	Leonard J Steinman II	1,002	2.56%	

U.S. House of Representatives — Missouri's 3rd Congressional District — Cole County (2018)
Party	Candidate	Votes	%	±%
Republican	Blaine Luetkemeyer	23,049	69.29%	
Democratic	Katy Geppert	9,649	29.00%	
Libertarian	Donald Stolle	549	1.65%	

U.S. House of Representatives — Missouri's 3rd Congressional District — Cole County (2016)
Party	Candidate	Votes	%	±%
Republican	Blaine Luetkemeyer	26,481	71.61%	−0.51
Democratic	Kevin Miller	9,368	25.33%	+1.19
Libertarian	Dan Hogan	815	2.20%	−1.54
Constitution	Doanita Simmons	314	0.85%	+0.85

U.S. House of Representatives — Missouri's 3rd Congressional District — Cole County (2014)
Party	Candidate	Votes	%	±%
Republican	Blaine Luetkemeyer	16,401	72.12%	+1.77
Democratic	Courtney Denton	5,491	24.14%	−3.10
Libertarian	Steven Hedrick	851	3.74%	+1.33
Write-In	Harold Davis	1	>0.00%	

U.S. House of Representatives — Missouri’s 3rd Congressional District — Cole County (2012)
Party	Candidate	Votes	%	±%
Republican	Blaine Luetkemeyer	25,576	70.35%	
Democratic	Eric C. Mayer	9,901	27.24%	
Libertarian	Steven Wilson	877	2.41%	

==== Presidential ====
United States presidential election results for Cole County, Missouri
Year	Republican		Democratic		Third party(ies)	
Year	No.	%	No.	%	No.	%
1888	1,708	48.13%	1,824	51.39%	17	0.48%
1892	1,752	47.82%	1,844	50.33%	68	1.86%
1896	2,033	47.53%	2,198	51.39%	46	1.08%
1900	2,157	47.84%	2,320	51.45%	32	0.71%
1904	2,081	47.48%	2,244	51.20%	58	1.32%
1908	2,402	48.58%	2,494	50.44%	48	0.97%
1912	2,103	43.22%	2,447	50.29%	316	6.49%
1916	2,746	48.15%	2,915	51.11%	42	0.74%
1920	5,878	58.31%	4,167	41.34%	36	0.36%
1924	6,205	52.49%	5,033	42.58%	583	4.93%
1928	6,637	50.54%	6,481	49.35%	15	0.11%
1932	5,636	38.26%	9,068	61.56%	27	0.18%
1936	6,180	40.91%	8,831	58.46%	95	0.63%
1940	7,664	48.23%	8,219	51.72%	9	0.06%
1944	7,364	50.76%	7,139	49.21%	4	0.03%
1948	6,909	46.60%	7,891	53.23%	25	0.17%
1952	9,700	56.36%	7,507	43.62%	3	0.02%
1956	9,323	55.79%	7,388	44.21%	0	0.00%
1960	9,763	53.36%	8,532	46.64%	0	0.00%
1964	10,068	55.33%	8,127	44.67%	0	0.00%
1968	11,575	60.55%	5,916	30.95%	1,625	8.50%
1972	16,685	77.83%	4,754	22.17%	0	0.00%
1976	14,370	63.86%	7,949	35.32%	184	0.82%
1980	16,373	61.96%	9,210	34.86%	840	3.18%
1984	20,366	75.24%	6,702	24.76%	0	0.00%
1988	18,023	68.16%	8,359	31.61%	59	0.22%
1992	15,270	48.78%	10,201	32.59%	5,833	18.63%
1996	16,140	55.01%	10,857	37.00%	2,345	7.99%
2000	20,167	61.53%	12,056	36.78%	552	1.68%
2004	24,752	67.44%	11,753	32.02%	196	0.53%
2008	24,385	62.79%	13,959	35.95%	490	1.26%
2012	24,490	65.85%	12,005	32.28%	695	1.87%
2016	24,616	65.37%	10,913	28.98%	2,127	5.65%
2020	26,086	65.99%	12,694	32.11%	749	1.89%
2024	26,686	66.46%	12,874	32.06%	592	1.47%

=== Missouri presidential preference primary (2008) ===
Former U.S. Senator and President Barack Obama (D-Illinois) received more votes, a total of 4,642, than any candidate from either party in Cole County during the 2008 presidential primary. Cole County was one of only six counties (including the independent city of St. Louis) that backed Obama in Missouri.

== See also ==
- National Register of Historic Places listings in Cole County, Missouri
