= List of geological features on Titania =

This is a list of named geological features on Titania.

== Chasmata ==
Titanian chasmata are named after the locations of plays by William Shakespeare.

Name	Coordinates	Diameter (km)	Approval Date	Namesake	Refs
Belmont Chasma	8.50°S 32.60°E	258	1988	Belmont (The Merchant of Venice)	WGPSN
Messina Chasma	33.30°S 335°E	1492	1988	Messina, Italy (Much Ado About Nothing)	WGPSN

== Craters ==
Titanian craters are named after female characters in the plays of William Shakespeare.

Name	Coordinates	Diameter (km)	Approval Date	Namesake	Refs
Adriana	20.10°S 3.90°E	50	1988	The Comedy of Errors	WGPSN
Bona	55.80°S 351.20°E	51	1988	Henry VI, part 3	WGPSN
Calphurnia	42.40°S 291.40°E	100	1988	Julius Caesar	WGPSN
Elinor	44.80°S 333.60°E	74	1988	King John	WGPSN
Gertrude	15.80°S 287.10°E	326	1988	Hamlet	WGPSN
Imogen	23.80°S 321.20°E	28	1988	Cymbeline	WGPSN
Iras	19.20°S 338.80°E	33	1988	Antony and Cleopatra	WGPSN
Jessica	55.30°S 285.90°E	64	1988	The Merchant of Venice	WGPSN
Katherine	51.20°S 331.90°E	75	1988	Henry VIII	WGPSN
Lucetta	14.70°S 277.10°E	58	1988	The Two Gentlemen of Verona	WGPSN
Marina	15.50°S 316°E	40	1988	Pericles, Prince of Tyre	WGPSN
Mopsa	11.90°S 302.20°E	101	1988	The Winter's Tale	WGPSN
Phrynia	24.30°S 309.20°E	35	1988	Timon of Athens	WGPSN
Ursula	12.40°S 45.20°E	135	1988	Much Ado About Nothing	WGPSN
Valeria	34.50°S 4.20°E	59	1988	Coriolanus	WGPSN

== Rupēs ==
Titanian rupēs are named after the locations of plays by William Shakespeare.

Name	Coordinates	Diameter (km)	Approval Date	Namesake	Refs
Roussillon Rupes	14.70°S 26.50°E	402	1988	Roussillon (All's Well That Ends Well)	WGPSN
