= Ursula (name) =

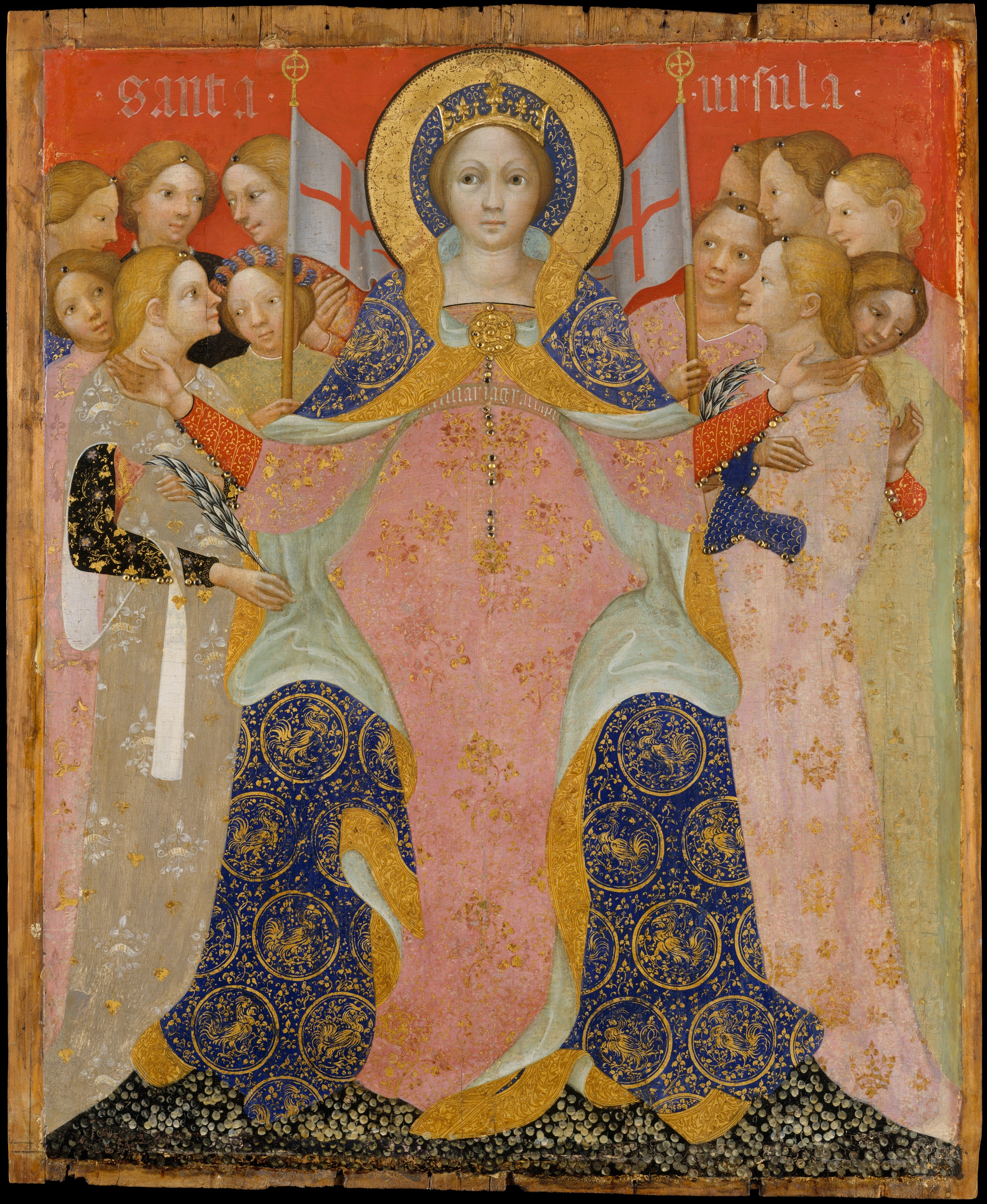
- Saint Ursula and her maidens by Niccolò di Pietro, circa 1410.
- Pronunciation: /ˈɜːrsjʊlə/ German: [ˈʊʁzula]
- Gender: Feminine
- Language: German, English

Origin
- Language: Latin
- Origin: ursa
- Meaning: "little bear"

Other names
- Variant forms: Uschi, Usch, Urs

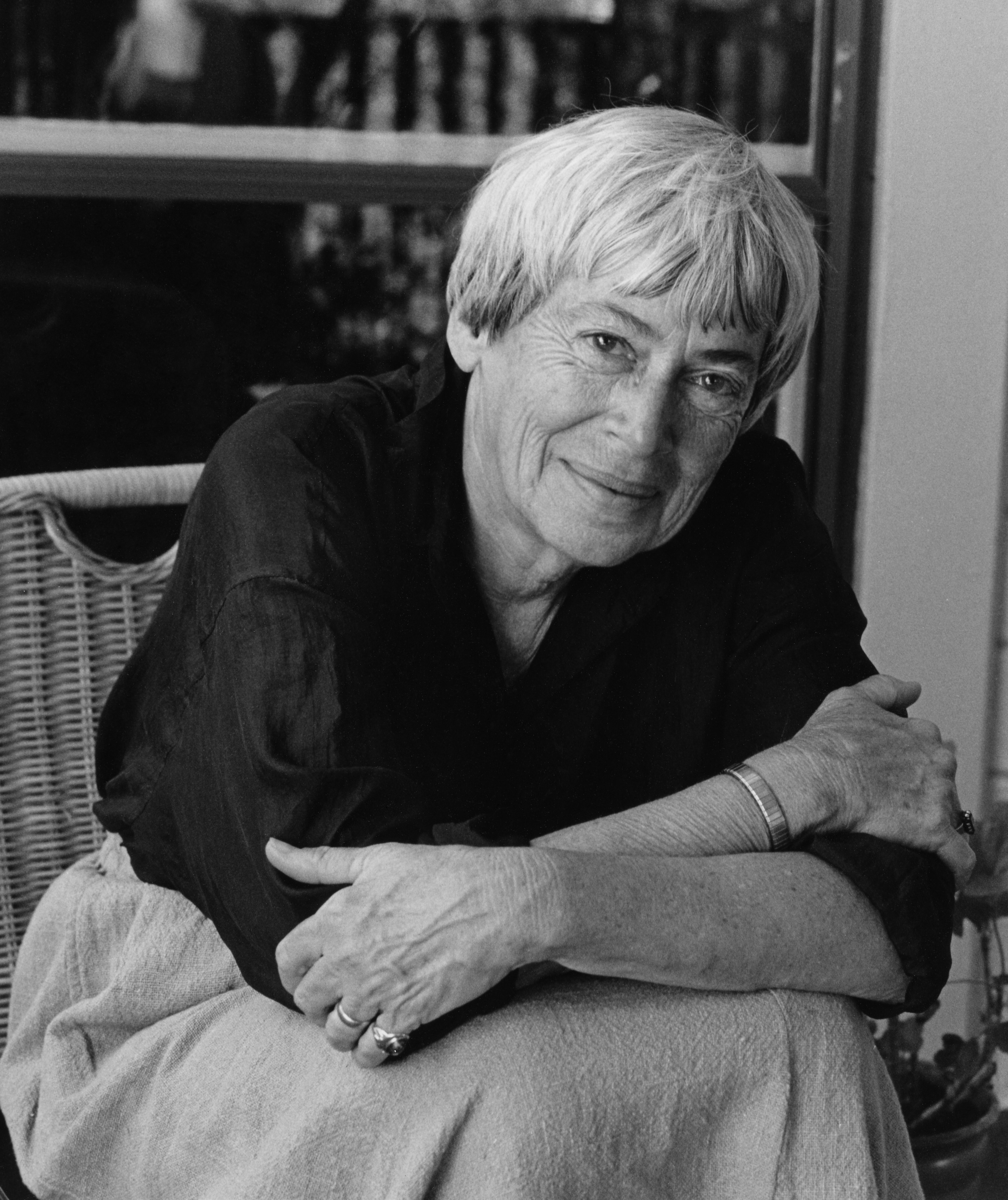
American author Ursula K. Le Guin (1929–2018)

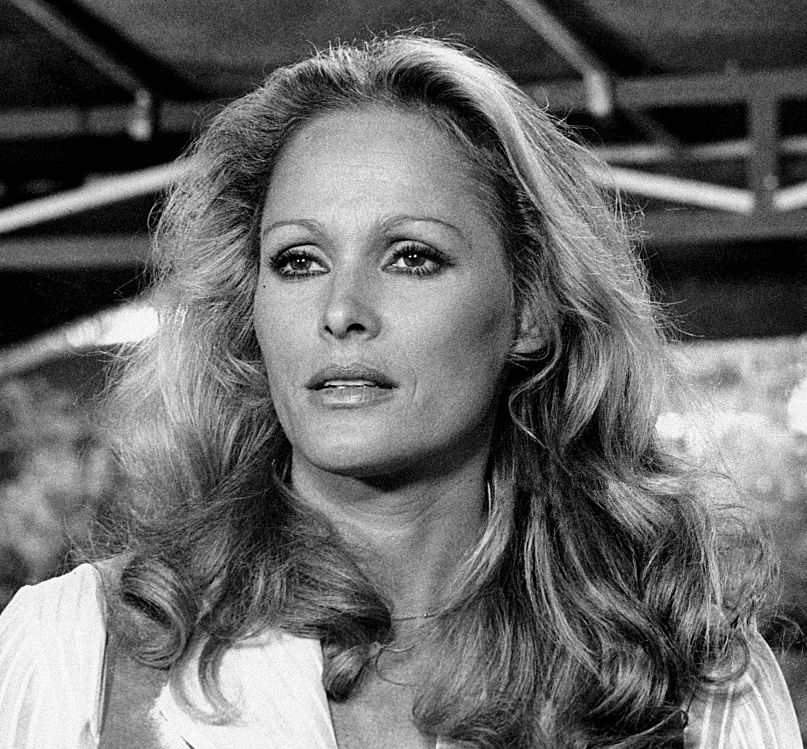
Swiss-born actress Ursula Andress (born 1936) in 1974

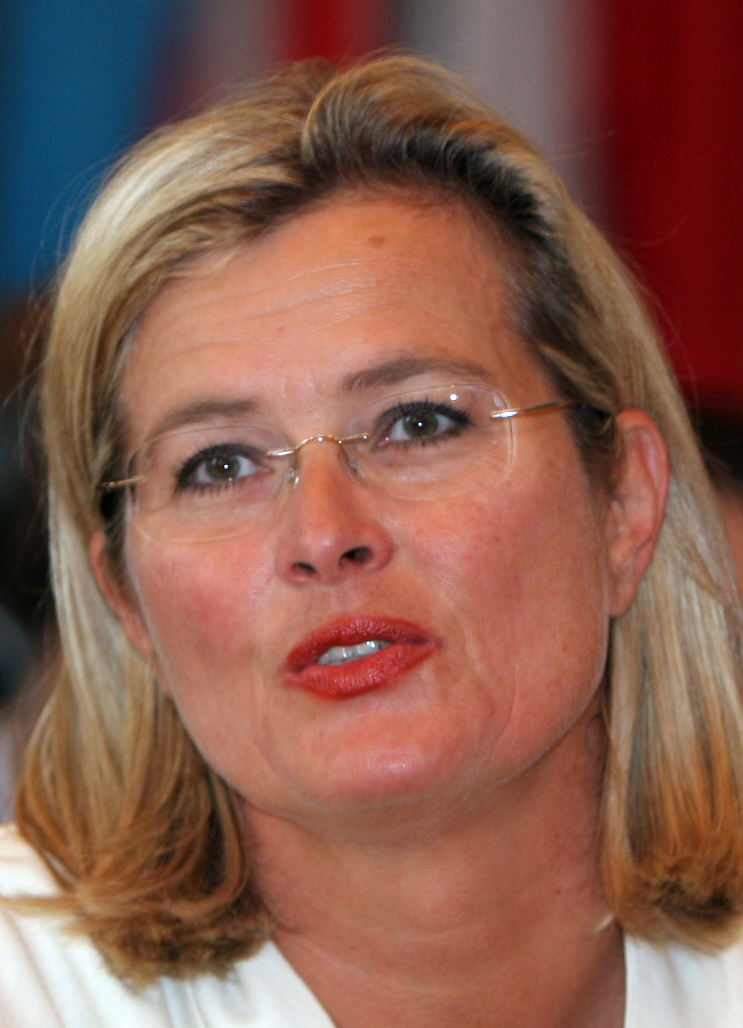
Austrian diplomat and politician Ursula Plassnik (born 1956)

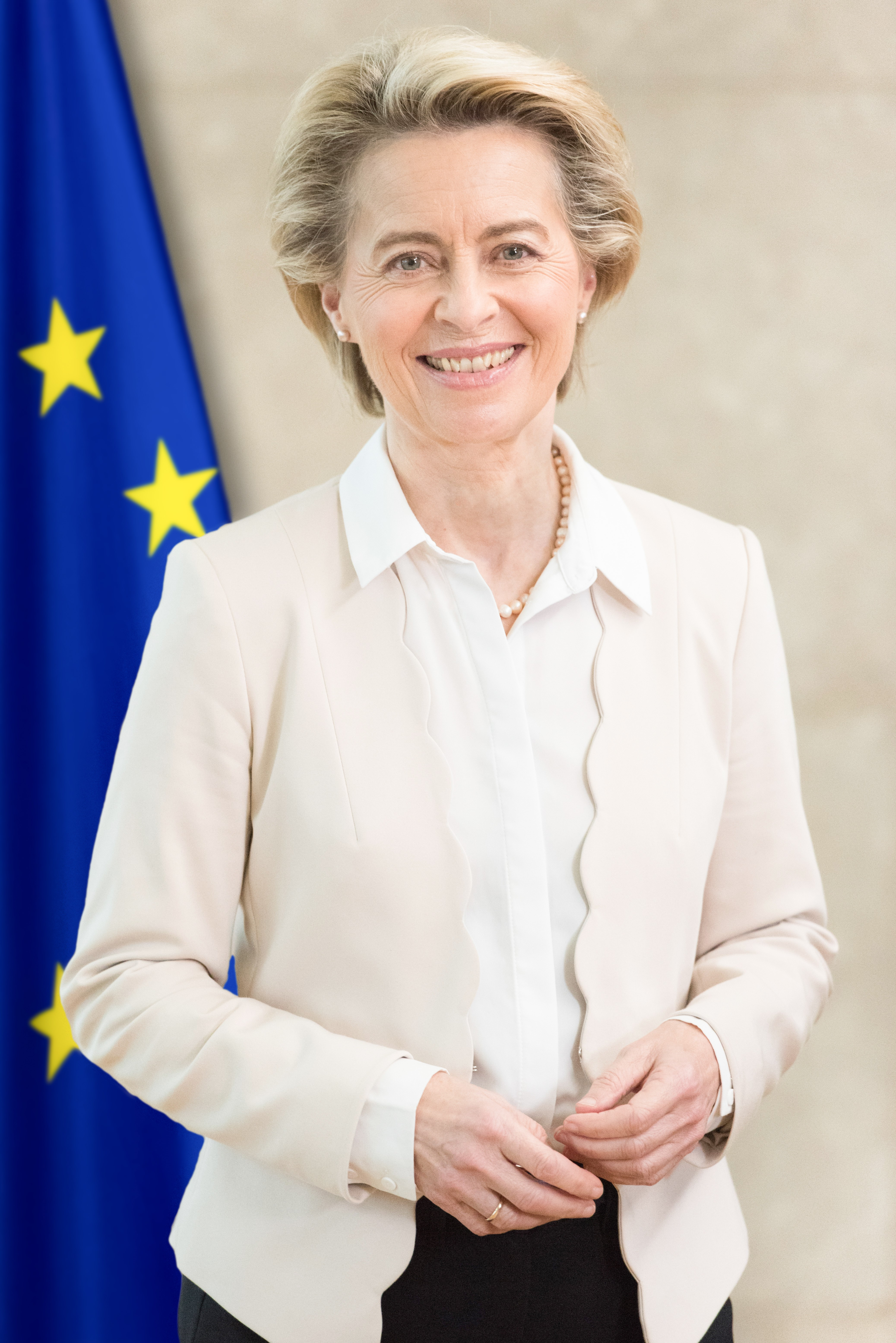
German politician Ursula von der Leyen (born 1958)

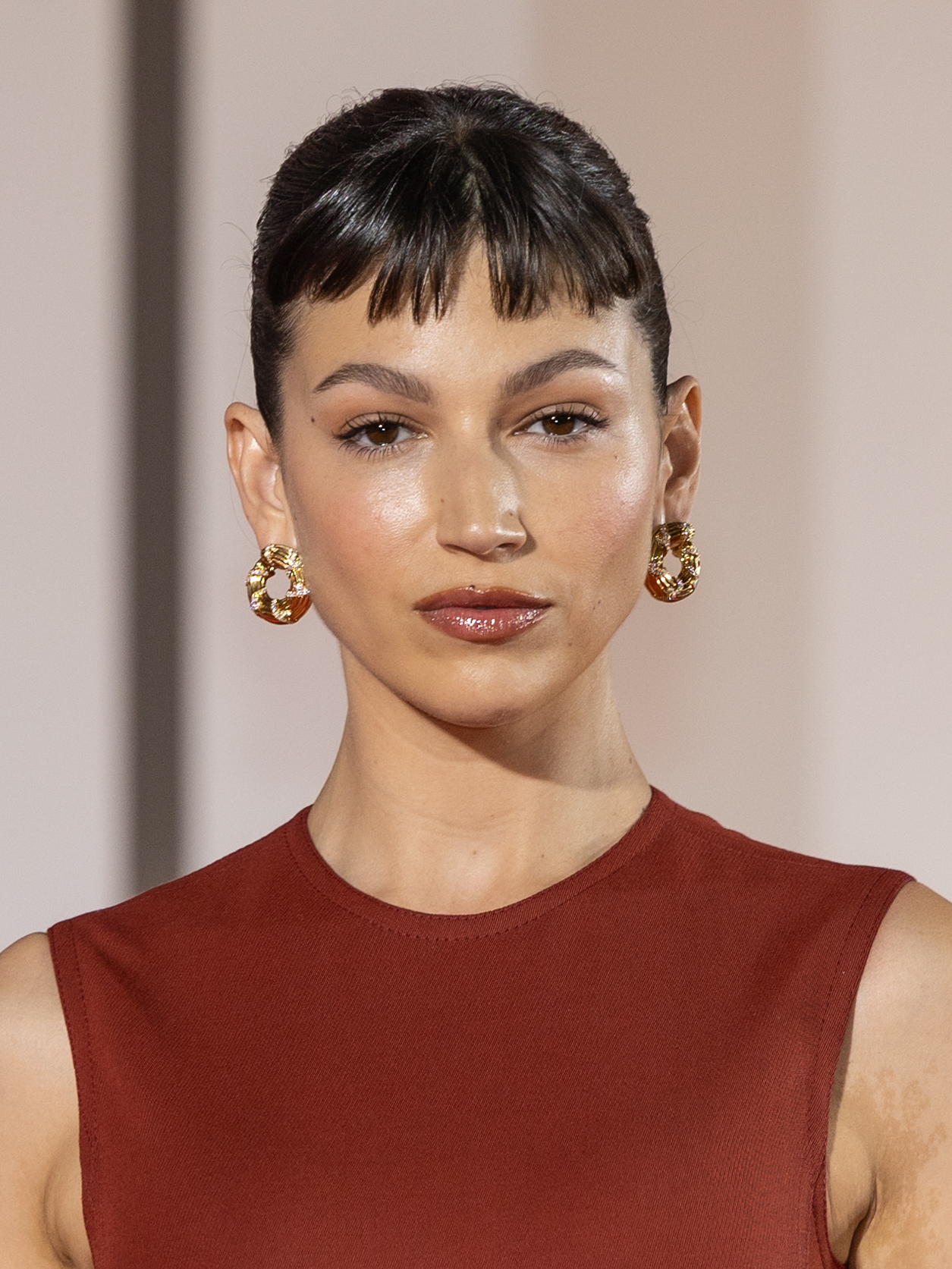
Spanish actress Úrsula Corberó (born 1989)

Ursula is a feminine given name in several languages. The name is derived from a diminutive of the Latin ursa, which means "bear". In the English-speaking world, the name was most common in the 16th century, but has since become relatively rare, although its use has been influenced since the twentieth century by the Swiss-born actress Ursula Andress (born 1936). It was among the most popular names for newborn girls in Germany from the 1920s to the 1950s. Ulla, Ursel, and Uschi are German short forms of the name.

Ursula is a villain in the 1989 Disney animated film The Little Mermaid and its 2023 live-action remake The Little Mermaid.

Other forms of the name include:

- Orsolya in Hungarian
- Úrsula in Spanish (notice the acute accent)
- Uršula in Bosnian
- Ursule in French
- Uršulė in Lithuanian
- Urszula in Polish
- Uršula / Urša / Urška in Slovenian

== People named Ursula or Úrsula ==
- Saint Ursula (died 383)
- Ursula, theoretical founding ancestor of Haplogroup U (mtDNA)
- Ursula of Brandenburg, Duchess of Münsterberg-Oels (1450–1508), a princess of Brandenburg by birth
- Ursula of Brandenburg (1488–1510), German noblewoman
- Ursula Andress (born 1936), Swiss actress
- Ursula Appolloni (1929–1994), Canadian politician
- Ursula Tibbels Auer (1883–1981), American nurse and businesswoman
- Ursula Bagdasarjanz (born 1934), Swiss violinist
- Ursula Bethell, Baroness Westbury (1924–2023), British noblewoman and philanthropist
- Ursula Bloom (1892–1984), British novelist
- Ursula Bright (1835–1915), British activist for married women's property rights
- Uschi Brüning (born 1947), German jazz and soul singer and songwriter
- Ursula Buchfellner (born 1961), German model and actress
- Ursula Buckel (1925–2005), German soprano singer
- Ursula Burns (born 1958), American businesswoman
- Ursula Bühler Hedinger (1943–2009), Swiss aviation pioneer, the first woman from Switzerland to hold a license to fly a jet and first Swiss female flight instructor
- Ursula Caberta (born 1950), German politician, critic of the Church of Scientology
- Ursula Chikane, South African television and radio presenter
- Úrsula Corberó (born 1989), Spanish actress
- Ursula Curtiss (1923–1984), American mystery writer
- Lady Ursula d'Abo (1916–2017), English socialite
- Uschi Digard (born 1948), Swedish former softcore porn star and model
- Uschi Disl (born 1970), German biathlete
- Ursula Donath (1931–2026), German track and field athlete
- Ursula Dubosarsky (born 1961), Australian writer
- Uschi Elleot (1899–1975), German stage and film actress
- Ursula Engelen-Kefer (born 1943), German labor leader
- Ursula Eriksson (born 1967), Swedish murderer accused of manslaughter in Britain
- Ursula Fanthorpe (1929–2009), British poet
- Ursula Franklin (1921–2016), Canadian metallurgist
- Uschi Freitag (born 1989), German-Dutch female diver
- Ursula Gauthier, French journalist
- Ursula Gibson, American physicist
- Uschi Glas (born 1944), German actress
- Ursula Goodenough (born 1943), American biologist and writer
- Ursula Haubner (born 1945), Austrian politician
- Ursula Haverbeck (1928–2024), German neo-Nazi activist, author, and convict
- Ursula Hayden (born 1966), American professional wrestler, actress, and business woman
- Ursula Hegi (born 1946), American author
- Ursula Henderson, South Australian politician
- Ursula Herrmann (died 1981), German female murder victim
- Ursula Kathleen Hicks, Lady Hicks (1896–1985), Irish economist and academic
- Ursula Holden-Gill (born 1974), British actress
- Ursula Howells (1922–2005), British actress
- Ursula Jeans (1906–1973), British actress
- Ursula Karven (born 1964), German actress, writer, model, and yoga instructor
- Uschi Keszler (born 1948), German figure skater
- Ursula King (born 1938), German scholar of religion
- Ursula Koch (born 1941), Swiss politician
- Ursula Krechel (born 1947), German writer and poet
- Ursula Kübler (1928–2010), Swiss ballerina and actress
- Ursula K. Le Guin (1929–2018), American author
- Ursula Ledóchowska (1865–1939), Austrian-born Polish religious leader
- Ursula Lehr (1930–2022), German academic and politician
- Ursula von der Leyen (born 1958), German politician and current president of the European Commission
- Ursula Martinez (born 1966), British writer and performer
- Úrsula Micaela Morata (1628–1703), Spanish nun
- Ursula Mommens (1908–2010), British potter
- Úrsula Murayama (born 1972) Mexican actress
- Uschi Nerke (born 1944), German actress and television presenter
- Ursula Niebuhr (1908–1997), American theologian
- Uschi Obermaier (born 1946), German model and actress
- Ursula O'Leary (1926–1993), English actress
- Ursula Plassnik (born 1956), Austrian politician
- Ursula Pole, Baroness Stafford (c. 1504 – 1570), English noblewoman
- Ursula Ratasepp (born 1982), Estonian actress
- Ursula Reit (1914–1998), German actress
- Ursula Reutner (born 1975), German linguist
- Ursula Ridley, Viscountess Ridley (1904–1967), British government official and charity worker
- Ursula Rucker, American recording artist
- Ursula von Rydingsvard (born 1942), American sculptor
- Ursula Schaeppi (born 1940), Swiss actress, playwright and comedian
- Ursula Schleicher (born 1933), German politician and harpist
- Ursula Sillge (born 1946), German sociologist and LGBT activist
- Ursula Southeil (1488–1561), English soothsayer
- Uschi Steigenberger (1951–2018), German condensed matter physicist
- Ursula Stephens (born 1954), Australian politician
- Ursula Strozynski (born 1954), German painter and graphic artist
- Ursula Vernon (born 1977), American artist and writer
- Ursula Vaughan Williams (1911–2007), British poet
- Ursula Moray Williams (1911–2006), British author
- Ursula Wyss (born 1973), Swiss economist and politician

== People named Ursule ==
- Ursule Molinaro (1916–2000), French-American writer and translator
- Ursule Wibaut (1887–?), French Olympic footballer

== Fictional characters ==
- Ursula the Pig Woman, proprietor of a hot food stall and public lavatory, in the 1614 play Bartholomew Fayre: A Comedy by Ben Jonson
- Ursula, in the 2004 comic strip Brewster Rockit
- Ursula, in the 2003 video game Fire Emblem
- Ursula, on the 1967 animated television series George of the Jungle and the 1997 live-action film adaptation of the same name
- Ursula, in the 1989 Studio Ghibli film Kiki's Delivery Service
- Ursula, from the 1989 Disney film The Little Mermaid and the 2023 live-action remake of the same name
- Ursula, in the 2006 video game Metal Gear Solid: Portable Ops
- Ursula, in the play Much Ado About Nothing by William Shakespeare
- Ursula, in the 1997 animated television series Pokémon
- Ursula, name given to Elizabeth and George Warleggan's daughter in season 4 of Poldark
- Ursula, in the 1996 film Set It Off
- Ursula, from Xenoblade Chronicles 2
- Ursula, from the 2024 manga series No\Name
- Ursula Beresford Todd, in the 2013 novel Life After Life by Kate Atkinson and the 2022 TV series Life After Life based on the book
- Ursula Brangwen, in the 1915 novel The Rainbow and the 1920 novel Women in Love by D. H. Lawrence
- Ursula Buffay, in the 1990s television sitcoms Mad About You and Friends
- Ursula Callistis, in the 2017 animated television series Little Witch Academia
- Ursula Hanson, a police dispatcher in the 2001 film Super Troopers
- Ursula Hartmann, from the 2006 anime/manga series Strike Witches
- Úrsula Iguarán, in the 1967 novel One Hundred Years of Solitude by Gabriel García Márquez
- Ursula Merkle, in the 1960 musical Bye Bye Birdie
- Úrsula (character), a protagonist of the Mexican sitcom Skimo
- Ursule Mirouët, title character of an 1841 novel by Honoré de Balzac
