= Ursula =

Ursula commonly refers to:

- Ursula (name), feminine given name
  - Ursula (The Little Mermaid)
  - Ursula K. Le Guin (1929–2018), American author
  - Ursula von der Leyen (born 1958), German politician, president of the European Commission since 2018
  - Ursula of Cologne (fl. 4th century)

Ursula may also refer to:

- Ursula (album), an album by American jazz pianist Mal Waldron
- Ursula (crater), a crater on Titania, a moon of Uranus
- Ursula (detention center), processing facility for unaccompanied minors in McAllen, Texas
- Ursula Channel, body of water in British Columbia, Canada
- 375 Ursula, a large main-belt asteroid
- HMS Ursula, a destroyer and two submarines that served with the Royal Navy
- Tropical Storm Ursula (disambiguation), a typhoon, two cyclones, and a tropical depression, all in the Pacific Ocean

== See also ==
- Urszula
