= Uranus in fiction =

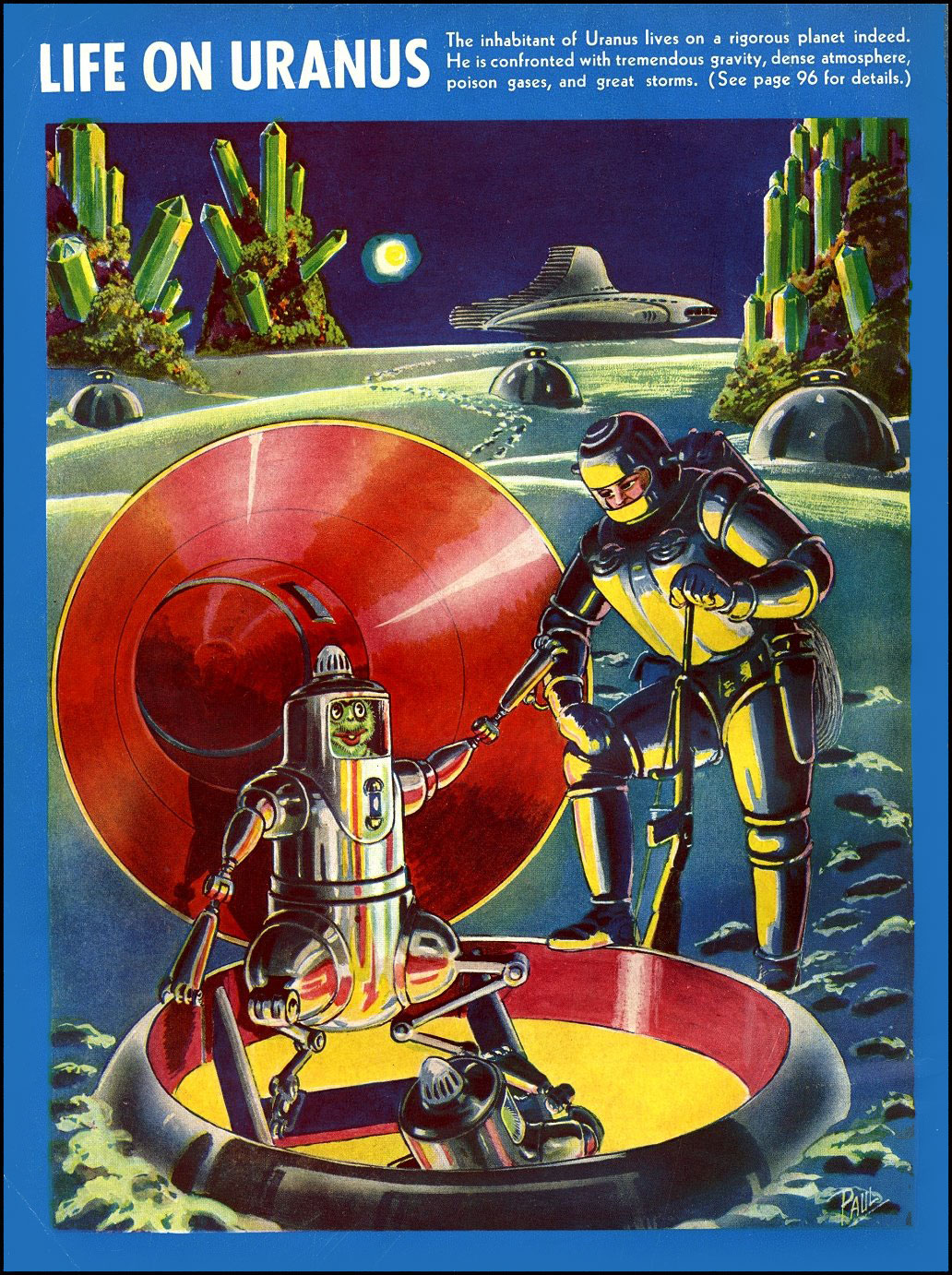
"Life on Uranus" by Frank R. Paul. Back cover of Fantastic Adventures, April 1940.

Uranus has been used as a setting in works of fiction since shortly after its discovery in 1781, albeit infrequently. The earliest depictions portrayed it as having a solid surface, whereas later stories portrayed it more accurately as a gaseous planet. The moons of Uranus have also appeared in a handful of works. Both the planet and its moons have experienced a slight trend of increased representation in fiction over time.

== Uranus ==
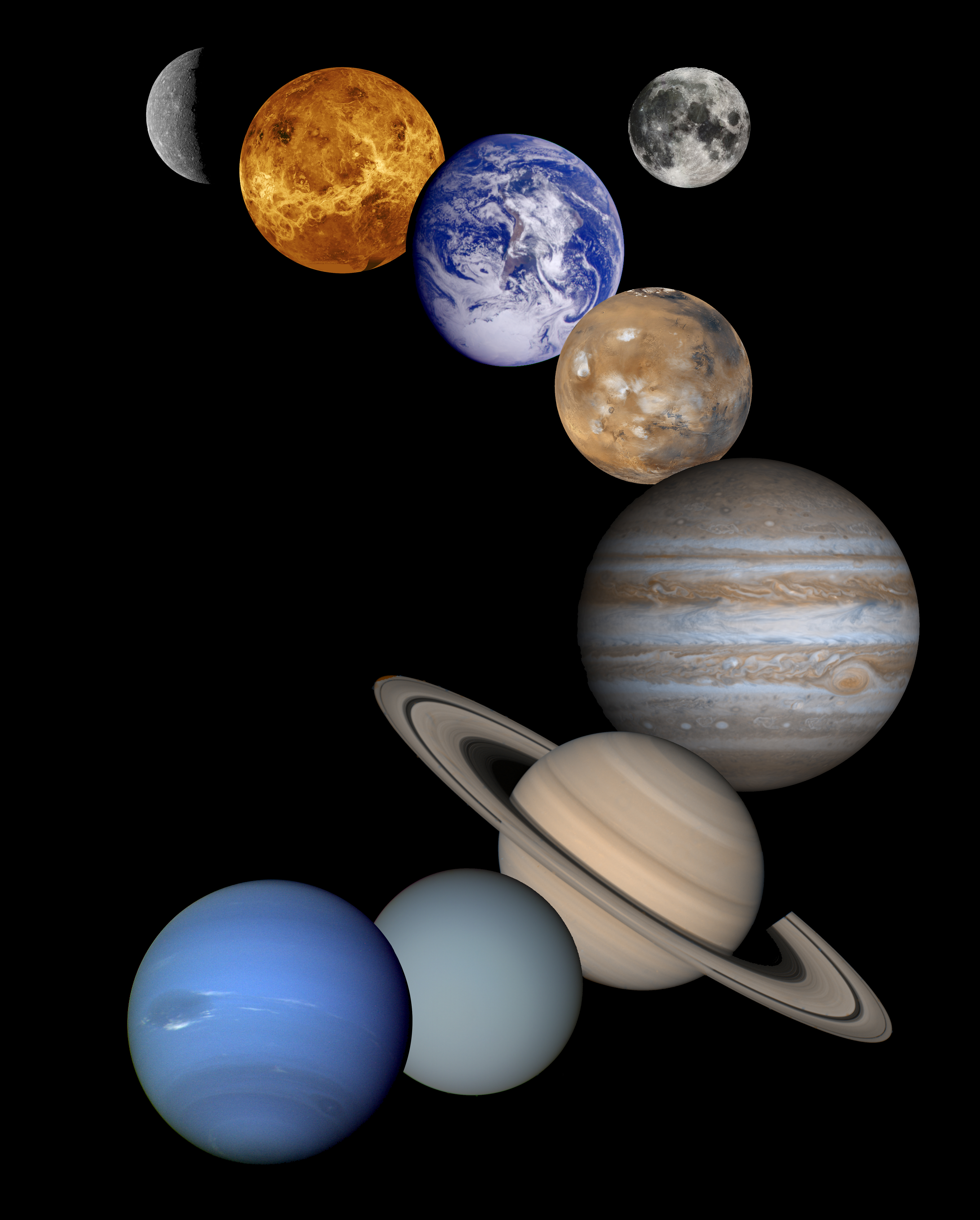
Uranus appears infrequently in fiction compared to other locations in the Solar System. Clicking on a planet leads to the article about its depiction in fiction.

Uranus was discovered in 1781 and has comparatively rarely been featured in fiction since then; in the catalogue of early science fiction works compiled by E. F. Bleiler and Richard Bleiler in the reference works Science-Fiction: The Early Years from 1990 and Science-Fiction: The Gernsback Years from 1998, Uranus only appears in 6 (out of 2,475) and 9 (out of 1,835) works respectively, compared to 194 for Mars in fiction and 131 for Venus in fiction in The Gernsback Years alone. Various explanations for this lack of representation have been proposed, including the planet's relatively late date of discovery, its remote location, its presumed hostile environmental conditions, and its featureless appearance in telescopes.

=== Early depictions ===
The planet's first appearance in a work of fiction was in the pseudonymous "Monsieur Vivenair"'s 1784 novel A Journey Lately Performed Through the Air, in an Aerostatic Globe, Commonly Called an Air Balloon, from this Terraqueous Globe to the Newly Discovered Planet, Georgium Sidus, a satire of the then-reigning British monarch George III and his court. In the subgenre of works visiting multiple locations in the Solar System that appeared throughout the 19th century, Uranus was rarely included, one exception being the anonymously published 1837 novel Journeys into the Moon, Several Planets and the Sun.

Early works about Uranus incorrectly envisioned it as a solid planet. Human colonization of the planet and alien lifeforms living on the surface thus became recurring themes. In Stanley G. Weinbaum's 1935 short story "The Planet of Doubt", humans landing on Uranus encounter various seemingly-hostile aliens. Clifton B. Kruse's 1936 short story "Code of the Spaceways" likewise portrays the planet as having a solid surface, where space pirates with a paralysis ray have taken over a military base. In Raymond Z. Gallun's 1940 short story "The Long Winter", methane snow falls on the Uranian surface during the decades-long winter. Other early depictions of Uranus include Russell R. Winterbotham's 1937 short story "Clouds over Uranus" and the Buck Rogers series.

=== Later depictions ===
Once more became known about Uranus through advances in planetary science, fiction writers started depicting it more accurately as a gaseous planet. Thus Donald A. Wollheim's 1942 short story "Planet Passage" depicts a spaceship flying through Uranus, Fritz Leiber's 1962 short story "The Snowbank Orbit" features the atmosphere of Uranus being used for aerobraking, and Cecelia Holland's 1976 novel Floating Worlds portrays floating cities in the Uranian atmosphere as well as that of Saturn. Still, the 1962 film Journey to the Seventh Planet depicts a landing on the surface of Uranus—likely the only film to do so. Uranus also appears in Barry N. Malzberg's 1971 short story "Ah, Fair Uranus", in which it hosts aliens in conflict with humanity; the television series Doctor Who; the works of Mark Brandis; and various comic books.

Toward the end of the century there was a slight increase in depictions of Uranus in science fiction, including Charles Sheffield's 1985 short story "Dies Irae" about life in the atmosphere, Geoffrey A. Landis's 1999 short story "Into the Blue Abyss" in which there is life in the ocean below, and G. David Nordley's 1999 short story "Mustardseed". The planet appears briefly in Kim Stanley Robinson's 1985 novel The Memory of Whiteness. In games, Uranus appears as a source of deuterium and helium-3 in the tabletop role-playing game Transhuman Space and the video game series Mass Effect.

== Moons ==
Uranus's moons have appeared in a handful of works, and this has become more common as more has become known about them. The moons are preserved in their natural state in some works such as Kim Stanley Robinson's 1996 novel Blue Mars, and subject to resource extraction by way of space mining in others such as the video game Descent. In Neil R. Jones's Durna Rangue series that started with the 1936 short story "Little Hercules", the titular cult is exiled to Oberon. Ariel was discovered in 1851 and appears in J. Harvey Haggard's 1933 short story "Evolution Satellite", in which evolution on the moon is so rapid as to take place during the timeframe of an individual organism's lifespan. Miranda was discovered in 1948 and appears in G. David Nordley's 1993 short story "Into the Miranda Rift", in which explorers are stranded on the surface. Titania, which was discovered a few years after Uranus itself in 1787, appears in the tabletop role-playing game Eclipse Phase, in which its canyon system Messina Chasmata is a tourist attraction.

== See also ==
- Solar System in fiction
