= Úrsula =

Úrsula may refer to:

- Úrsula (character), a protagonist of the 2006–07 Mexican sitcom Skimo
- Úrsula (name), a Spanish feminine given name
