= Elizabeth Tuttle =

American woman and eugenics study subject (1645 – c. 1691)

- Born: 1645
- Died: c. 1691 (about aged 46)
- Spouse: Richard Edwards

Elizabeth Tuttle also known by her married name Elizabeth Tuttle Edwards (1645–1691 or after) was a Puritan woman who lived in the New Haven Colony in what is now the state of Connecticut. She was brought up in a financially stable home and raised to be a Puritan "goodwife". Her dreams of running her own flouring household, like her mother, were ruined when she married Richard Edwards and was entangled in a sex scandal. The couple were married for 24 years and had six children. Rare for the time, Tuttle was divorced by her husband in 1691 for adultery.

Tuttle and her descendants were subjects in the field of Eugenics by Charles Benedict Davenport and Clarence Darrow, having been the ancestor of many great leaders and educators. Descendants include Robert Treat Paine, signer of the Declaration of Independence, presidents of noted universities, a founder of a law school, an American Civil War general. Pierpont Edwards and Aaron Burr, Vice President of the United States, were said to have inherited defects of her character. Her grandson was Jonathan Edwards, a revivalist preacher known as "America's theologian".

== Early life ==
Elizabeth Tuttle was born in 1645 and baptized in November 1645 in New Haven as the eighth of twelve children born to William and Elizabeth Tuttle. Their twelve children were John, Hannah, Thomas, Jonathan, David, Joseph, Sarah, Elizabeth, Simon, Benjamin, Mercy, and Nathaniel. She was named after her mother, who she looked to as a good example of a Puritan "goodwife". Most of her siblings' misbehavior in their adolescence caused them to attract negative attention from the town authorities. Elizabeth and her siblings had received thorough and intense educations.

William, Elizabeth, and their first three children arrived in New England on June 7, 1635, on board the Planter. They traveled with William's brothers and their families and his mother Isabella. William and Elizabeth settled initially in Charlestown. William was not accepted by the church there, which was problematic because church membership was a prerequisite for owning property in Charlestown. In 1636, his wife Elizabeth was accepted at the church in Boston. William helped establish the community now known as New Haven. On June 4, 1639, William signed the first covenant of the new colony. He was a farmer, merchant, part owner of a trading vessel, and a land owner in New Haven and the neighboring North Haven and East Haven communities. (Note: Some of William Tuttle's land is now part of the Yale University campus.) He served the community as a constable and a member of many town commissions.

Her mother, Elizabeth Tuttle, was described as having:

...ladylike refinement in apparel and household appointments. That she was a faithful and true wife and mother we have good reason to believe. All her twelve children were reared to maturity amid privations, dangers and trials, of which the mothers of the present day can hardly form a conception, and which very few indeed would have the courage to face or the strength to endure. In her widowhood, heavy afflictions were added to her weight of years, but the religious faith and hope which she publicly professed in her youth, no doubt supported her as nothing else could do through all the dark and troubled way, and unto the end.

== Marriage ==
On November 19, 1667, at the age of twenty-two, Elizabeth Tuttle married Richard Edwards, a young Hartford cooper. (Note: Some sources state that Richard Edwards was a lawyer. Based upon research, Clarence Darrow thought it unlikely that he was a lawyer.) Tuttle was involved in a sex scandal with the birth of her first child Mary, who was an "early baby", born seven months after their marriage. Within their first year of marriage, the couple was brought before the Hartford magistrates and were fined for having conceived a child out of wedlock. It was rumored that she not only had premarital sexual relations with Richard, but also with a man named Joseph Preston, the son of wealthy businessman. Richard denied being the father of the baby, but the magistrates found that he was the father and they were forced to remain married. Elizabeth and Richard stayed married for twenty-four years and had more children. Tuttle's children were Mary, Timothy, Abigail, Elizabeth, Ann, Martha, (Note: According to Ola Elizabeth Winslow, Tuttle's first child (Mary) went to live with Elizabeth Tuttle's father in New Haven.) and Mabel. Like Tuttle, Edwards had received a good education. Having received an "ample" inheritance, he was able to provide a good education for his children.

In many ways Tuttle was a goodwife to her husband, but she became increasingly upset after one brother suffered a mental breakdown and when two murders were committed by two of her siblings. It became difficult for Tuttle to tend to her relationship with her husband. Jonathan Edwards' biographer Ola Elizabeth Winslow stated in 1940 that she was subject to mental illness and engaged in repeated events of infidelity and perversity throughout their marriage.

Her husband claimed that she withheld sex from him and he tried to divorce her beginning in 1689. Richard claimed that Tuttle admitted that she had sex with another man before their marriage. He also contended that his wife sold alcohol to Native Americans. By this time, he had an affair with Mary Talcott. In 1691, Richard successfully filed for divorce, on the grounds of "adultery and other immoralities". Astounding the citizens of Hartford, "Richard Edwards stood alone against the law, the ministry, the social standards of his time, and by sheer persistence and the weight of his own adamantine convictions forced an eventual victory," according this his biographer Ola Elizabeth Winslow. The couple was divorced on October 8, 1691, which was "almost without parallel" at the time. In the 17th century, women who were mentally ill were removed from the house while remaining married to their husbands. If a couple wanted to divorce, the church councils came up with compromise solutions to avoid breaking up marriages. In Tuttle's case, the divorce was granted about the time that Tuttle's sister Mercy committed murder. In 1692, Richard Edwards married a second time to Mary Talcott, with whom he had an affair. He became rich due to connections made through his second wife's prosperous family.

== Death and legacy ==
After her divorce in 1691, very little is known about Elizabeth Tuttle or her death. (Note: Her mother, Elizabeth Tuttle, died on December 30, 1684, at 76 years of age.)

Tuttle's story came to light after an account of her divorce was published in 1883, and as the result of research conducted for biographies about her grandson Jonathan Edwards. During the Colonial Revival period her story piqued the interests of eugenicists and antiquarians. Some considered her the "crazy grandmother" and sexual deviant, and others thought her to be a wonderful woman. In its review of Ava Chamberlain's nonfiction book The Notorious Elizabeth Tuttle: Marriage, Murder, and Madness in the Family of Jonathan Edwards (2012), Publishers Weekly states:

Chamberlain, a professor of history at Wright State in Ohio, searches for clues to the identity of Elizabeth Tuttle and recreates a mesmerizing drama of the breakdown of one family in a society bound by stringent concerns for order in family and society. Chamberlain reveals that Tuttle went through a series of traumas. Her marriage to Richard Edwards was troubled because of class differences between the two and because of a baby born seven months after the marriage, whom Richard suspected was not his. Then, 10 years after Elizabeth’s marriage, her brother Benjamin inexplicably murdered their sister Sarah. Elizabeth’s grief, anxiety, and depression caused her marriage to break apart: Richard depicted her as having failed to fulfill her duties as a wife and divorced her, a serious blow in a society where a woman’s role was defined by family. Recovering a lost chapter of early American intellectual and religious history, Chamberlain reveals not a harridan but a woman whose life was ruined by wrong choices and inconsolable griefs. (Note: See Wiktionary for the definition of harridan.)

== The Tuttle family ==
=== Immigration to the British colonies ===
Elizabeth Tuttle's family arrived in New England on June 7, 1635, on board the Planter. Those in the Tuttle party included Elizabeth Tuttle's grandmother Isabella Tuttle and her three sons and their families: the eldest son Richard Tuttle and his wife Anne and their three children, John Tuttle and his wife Joan and their four children as well as four children from Joan's previous marriage, and William Tuttle and his wife Elizabeth and their three young children. Once the Tuttle's arrived, Richard and John became prominent members of colonial society. Richard was elected constable in Boston in 1638. John Tuttle became a leading member in Ipswich, a colony about thirty miles outside of Boston. Seeing the successes of his brothers, William Tuttle tried to secure a strong foothold for his family. When he was unable to gain church membership, he moved his family to New Haven in 1639. This event broke his ties with his brothers.

=== Murder ===
There were horrific murders that members of the Tuttle family committed. In 1676 Benjamin Tuttle, one of Elizabeth's younger brothers, murdered their sister Sarah by striking her in the head with an axe. Her children were present during the attack. This crime was a shock to the entire Tuttle family. During Benjamin's trial, it was recorded that he murdered his sister in "a fit of rage". At the end of the trial, Benjamin Tuttle was found guilty and sentenced to death. He was hanged in Hartford on June 13, 1677. This wasn't the only horrific crime to take place within the Tuttle family. On the morning of June 23, 1691 Mercy Tuttle, one of Elizabeth Tuttle's younger sisters, murdered her seventeen-year-old son with an axe. She was convicted in October 1691, but was found "non compos mentis" in 1693 and was believed to have spent the rest of her life incarcerated.

== Elizabeth Tuttle's descendants ==
Tuttle was studied within the field of eugenics by Charles Benedict Davenport and Clarence Darrow. She was described as a beautiful, intelligent and strong-willed women, with little "moral sense" and was mentally unstable. She was said to have "had the nervous, sensitive and excitable temperament of a genius."

Between Tuttle and Richard Edwards, she was considered to have been the ancestor with notable descendants. Edwards had married a second time and had five sons and one daughter with Mary Talcott. According to Clarence Darrow, "None of Mary Talcott's progeny rose above mediocrity and their descendants gained no abiding reputation."

Tuttle's son Timothy graduated from Harvard College with bachelor's and master's degrees, which was considered remarkable at the time. For 59 years, he was the pastor of the church in East Windsor, Connecticut. Her daughters – Abigail Soughton, Elizabeth Remind, Ann Richardson, and Mabel Bigelow – had distinguished descendants, including Robert Treat Paine, signer of the Declaration of Independence.

She is a noted ancestor of her grandson Jonathan Edwards, whose descendants included many presidents of noted universities, a founder of a law school, an American Civil War general, and other noted individuals. Clarence Darrow reported in 1925 that her descendants included 12 college presidents, 265 college graduates, 65 college professors, 60 physicians, 100 clergymen, 75 army officers, 60 prominent authors, 100 lawyers, 30 judges, 80 public officers, 3 governors, mayors and State officials, 3 congressmen, 2 United States senators, and 1 Vice President." Descendants Pierpont Edwards and Aaron Burr, Vice President of the United States, were noted for their inheritance of the defects of her character.

Of the family, William E. Woodward stated:

Yet, in this hour of its decay, Puritanism produced its most profound intellection—its great philosopher—like one of those curious flowers which bloom only when their roots are dying. Jonathan Edwards was to Puritanism what Herbert Spencer was to the philosophy of rationalism. On the narrow plane of a bigoted religion he displayed an almost overwhelming intellection vigor. A queer strain ran through the family. His grandson was Aaron Burr who killed Alexander Hamilton. His grandmother was Elizabeth Tuttle, who was divorced by her husband for adultery, an unspeakable scandalous occurrence in that epoch. Elizabeth's sister murdered her child, and her brother was a murderer, too.

— William E. Woodward, George Washington, the image and the man

The Eugenics movement was largely discredited following the end of World War II.

== Bibliography ==
- Chamberlain, Ava (2012). The Notorious Elizabeth Tuttle: Marriage, Murder, and Madness in the Family of Jonathan Edwards. New York University Press. ISBN 9780814723722.
- Tuttle, George Frederick; Tuttle, George Frederick (1883). The descendants of William and Elizabeth Tuttle, who came from old to New England in 1635. Rutland, Vermont: Tuttle & Company.
