= Orsolya =

- Gender: feminine
- Language: Hungarian
- Name day: October 21

Origin
- Language: Latin
- Meaning: "little bear"

Other names
- Nicknames: Orsi, Orsika
- Cognate: Ursula
- Anglicisation: Ursula

Orsolya (Hungarian pronunciation: [ˈorʃojɒ]) is a Hungarian-language form of Ursula meaning literally "little bear" or "bear cub", derived from a diminutive form of the Latin word ursa "she-bear". Saint Ursula was a legendary virgin princess of the 4th century who was martyred by the Huns while returning from a pilgrimage. Today the story of Saint Ursula is overwhelmingly considered to be fiction. In England the saint was popular during the Middle Ages, and the name came into general use at that time.

Famous Hungarian females who share the same given name:

- Orsolya Dersffy (1583–1619), Hungarian noblewoman
- Orsolya Drozdik (born 1946), Hungarian feminist visual artist
- Orsolya Herr (born 1984), Hungarian handball player
- Orsolya Karalyos (born 1991), Hungarian handball player
- Orsolya Kasó (born 1988), Hungarian female water polo goalkeeper
- Orsolya Nagy (born 1977), Hungarian fencer
- Orsolya Szegedi (born 1989), Hungarian handball player
- Orsolya Takács (born 1985), Hungarian water polo player
- Orsolya Tóth (born 1981), Hungarian actress
- Orsolya Vérten (born 1982), Hungarian handball player
