= Roussillon (disambiguation) =

Roussillon is one of the historical counties of the former Principality of Catalonia, corresponding roughly to the present-day southern French département of Pyrénées-Orientales (Eastern Pyrenees) save Fenouillèdes.

Roussillon may also refer to:

== Places ==
- County of Roussillon, the medieval entity
- The southern area of the Languedoc-Roussillon, a region of France
- Roussillon Regional County Municipality, Quebec, a municipal county in Quebec, Canada
- Roussillon, Vaucluse, a commune in the Vaucluse department of France
- Roussillon, Isère, a commune in the Isère department of France
- Roussillon-en-Morvan, a commune in the Saône-et-Loire department of France

== People ==
- Girart de Roussillon (c. 810–877/879?), Frankish Burgundian leader
- Giselbert I of Roussillon (died 1014), count of Roussillon
- Girard I of Roussillon (died 1113), count of Roussillon
- Jean-Paul Roussillon (1931–2009), French actor
- Jérôme Roussillon (born 1993), French footballer

== Other uses ==
- Roussillon, an alternative name for the Spanish and French wine grape Grenache
  - Alicante Bouschet, a Portuguese wine grape that is also known as Roussillon
- Countess of Rousillon, Isabella of Majorca
- Rousillon (horse) (1981–2009), a racehorse
- Rousillon Rupes, a scarp on Titania, a moon of Uranus
