= Rupes =

Landform on other planets

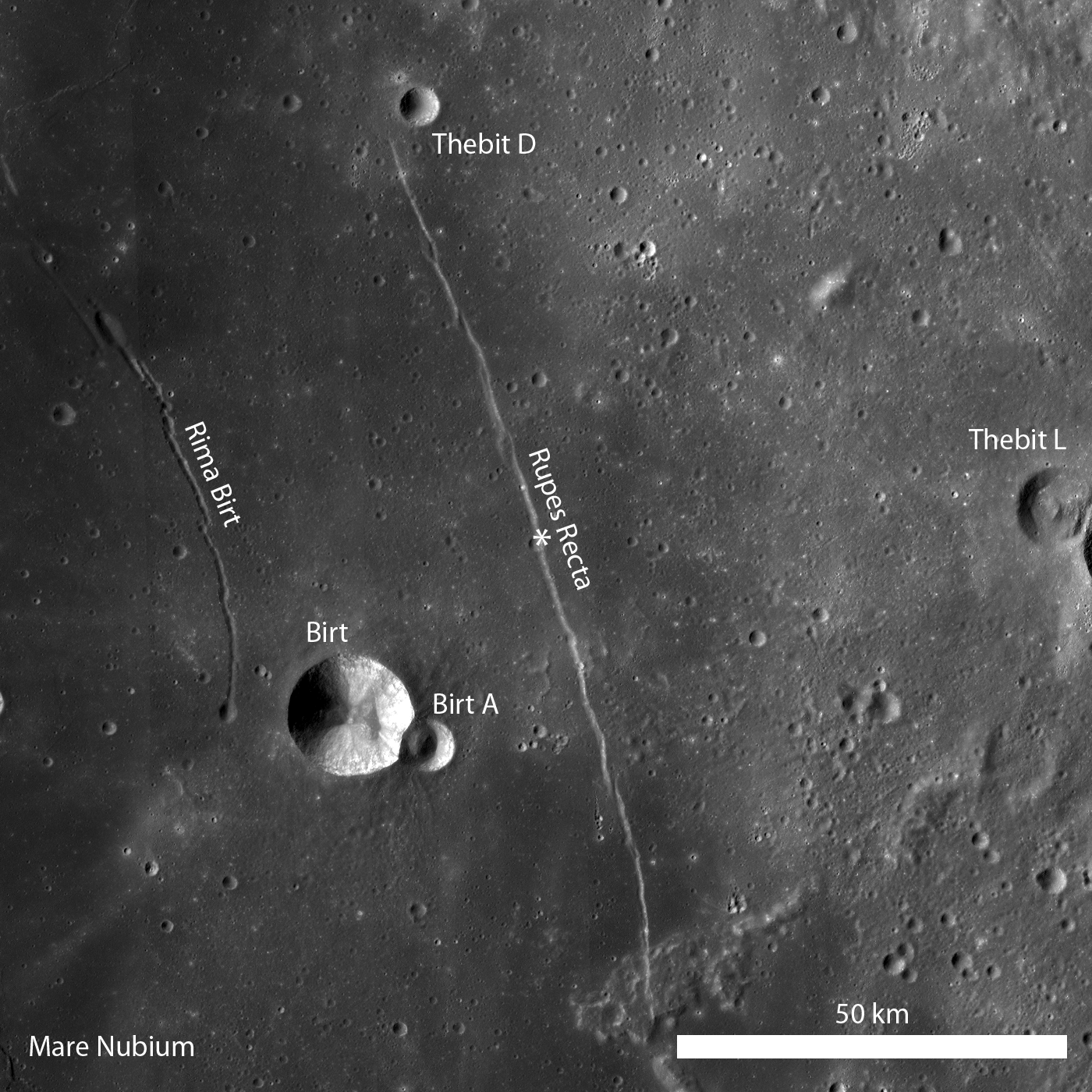
Rupes Recta is a well-known linear rille that extends over 100 km in length. Portion of LROC WAC monochrome mosaic, illumination is from the left, and asterisk notes location of LROC NAC (below) [NASA/GSFC/Arizona State University].

In planetary geology, rupes (/ˈruːpɪs/, plural: /ˈruːpiːz/) are escarpments on planets other than Earth.

As of January 2013, the IAU has named 62 such features in the Solar System, on Mercury (17), Venus (7), the Moon (8), Mars (23), the asteroids Vesta (2) and Lutetia (2), and Uranus's satellites Miranda (2) and Titania (1).

How rupes formed is, as of 2008, a matter of speculation. Compressional strain from the cooling of the crust of terrestrial planets and large-scale displacement due to impacts are the two dominant theories.

The term "rupes" comes from the Latin word for "cliff."

== See also ==
- Rupes on the Earth's moon
- Rupes on Mercury
- Rupes on Venus
- Rousillon Rupes
- Rupes Tenuis
- Verona Rupes
