= Ursula Tibbels Auer =

American nurse (1883–1981)

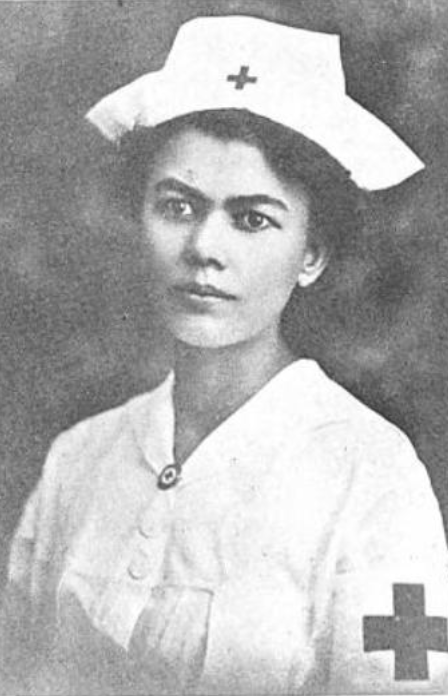
- Ursula Tibbels Auer, from a 1927 publication
- Born: April 23, 1883; Grant City, Missouri, U.S.
- Died: May 26, 1981 (aged 98); Elma, Washington, U.S.
- Occupations: Nurse, businesswoman

Ursula Tibbels Auer (April 23, 1883 – May 26, 1981) was an American nurse, social worker, clubwoman, and businesswoman. She was an American Red Cross nurse in Europe during World War I. In the 1920s she was co-founder and president of a baby food company based in Seattle.

== Early life and education ==
Tibbels was born in Grant City, Missouri, the daughter of Thomas Charles Tibbels and Anna Rebecca Holliday Tibbels. She earned a nursing degree at a hospital in Kansas, and later she studied food science at the University of Washington.

== Career ==
Tibbels taught school in Missouri as a young woman, and was secretary of the Washington State Nurses Association in the 1910s. During World War I, she was a nurse in Europe, including work in France, Belgium, Turkey, Greece, and Italy. In 1919 she was the nurse in charge of infant welfare at Kavadar, holding baby care clinics and distributing donated supplies to war refugees. She was awarded the Cross of Mercy for her work in Serbia.

In the 1920s, Auer was co-founder (with her "girlhood friend" Lilla Cobb Norman and Julia Fitzgerald) and president of Kiddie Kanned Foods, a woman-owned company packing and marketing tinned fruits and vegetables prepared for babies, children, and "invalids". In the 1930s, she was a school nurse and social worker, and she directed the Junior Red Cross Clinic in Seattle. During World War II, she taught first aid and home nursing classes, and demonstrated the use of gas masks. In the 1950s, she was vice-president and director of the Seattle area chapter of the Women's Overseas Service League.

== Publications ==
- "How the Violet's Wish Was Granted" (1921)
- "A Day in the Clinic" (1939)

== Personal life ==
Tibbels married a widowed German-born engineer, Carl Ludwig Auer, in 1920, soon after her return to the United States after the war. They had two children, Thomas and Elizabeth. Her husband died in 1952, and she died in 1981, at the age of 98, in Elma, Washington.
