= Grant City, Missouri =

City in Missouri, U.S.

- City
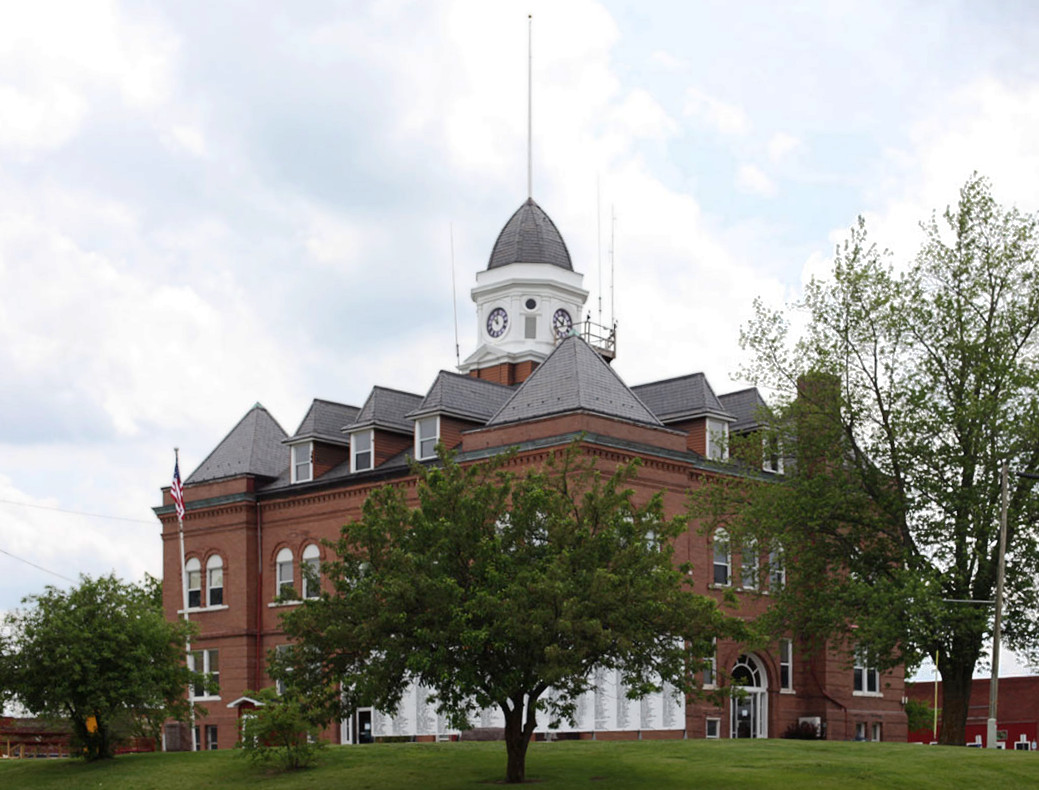
- Worth County Courthouse

- Location in Worth County and Missouri
- Coordinates: 40°29′09″N 94°24′48″W
- Country: United States
- State: Missouri
- County: Worth
- Township: Fletchall

Area
  - Total: 1.33 sq mi (3.44 km^{2})
  - Land: 1.33 sq mi (3.44 km^{2})
  - Water: 0 sq mi (0.00 km^{2})
- Elevation: 1,132 ft (345 m)

Population (2020)
  - Total: 817
  - Density: 614.7/sq mi (237.33/km^{2})
- Time zone: UTC-6 (Central (CST))
  - Summer (DST): UTC-5 (CST)
- ZIP codes: 64456
- Area code: 660
- FIPS code: 29-28594
- GNIS feature ID: 2396971
- Website: www.cityofgrantcity.com

Grant City is a city in and the county seat of Worth County, Missouri, United States. The population was 817 at the 2020 census.

== History ==
Grant City was laid out in 1864. The community has the name of General Ulysses S. Grant, afterward 18th President of the United States (1869–77). A post office called Grant City has been in operation since 1864.

The Worth County Courthouse was listed on the National Register of Historic Places in 1983.

== Geography ==
Grant City is located at the intersection of U. S. Route 169 and Missouri Route 46 and about one mile west of the Middle Fork of the Grand River.

According to the United States Census Bureau, the city has a total area of 1.33 square miles (3.44 km^{2}), all land.

== Demographics ==
Historical population
Census	Pop.	Note	%±
1880	493		—
1890	1,186		140.6%
1900	1,406		18.5%
1910	1,207		−14.2%
1920	1,305		8.1%
1930	1,126		−13.7%
1940	1,209		7.4%
1950	1,184		−2.1%
1960	1,061		−10.4%
1970	1,095		3.2%
1980	1,068		−2.5%
1990	998		−6.6%
2000	926		−7.2%
2010	859		−7.2%
2020	817		−4.9%
U.S. Decennial Census

=== 2010 census ===
As of the census of 2010, there were 859 people, 378 households, and 227 families living in the city. The population density was 645.9 inhabitants per square mile (249.4/km^{2}). There were 473 housing units at an average density of 355.6 per square mile (137.3/km^{2}). The racial makeup of the city was 98.4% White, 0.3% African American, 0.1% Native American, 0.1% Asian, 0.8% from other races, and 0.2% from two or more races. Hispanic or Latino of any race were 1.0% of the population.

There were 378 households, of which 24.6% had children under the age of 18 living with them, 46.6% were married couples living together, 9.3% had a female householder with no husband present, 4.2% had a male householder with no wife present, and 39.9% were non-families. 36.0% of all households were made up of individuals, and 19.3% had someone living alone who was 65 years of age or older. The average household size was 2.13 and the average family size was 2.76.

The median age in the city was 47.4 years. 19.7% of residents were under the age of 18; 8% were between the ages of 18 and 24; 18.1% were from 25 to 44; 27.6% were from 45 to 64; and 26.7% were 65 years of age or older. The gender makeup of the city was 46.4% male and 53.6% female.

=== 2000 census ===
As of the census of 2000, there were 926 people, 409 households, and 247 families living in the town. The population density was 735.2 inhabitants per square mile (283.9/km^{2}). There were 499 housing units at an average density of 396.2 per square mile (153.0/km^{2}). The racial makeup of the city was 99.03% White, 0.22% African American, 0.65% Native American and 0.11% Asian. Hispanic or Latino of any race were 0.11% of the population.

There were 409 households, out of which 27.4% had children under the age of 18 living with them, 46.2% were married couples living together, 10.5% had a female householder with no husband present, and 39.4% were non-families. 36.4% of all households were made up of individuals, and 20.0% had someone living alone who was 65 years of age or older. The average household size was 2.17 and the average family size was 2.82.

In the town the population was spread out, with 22.9% under the age of 18, 8.5% from 18 to 24, 22.5% from 25 to 44, 21.7% from 45 to 64, and 24.4% who were 65 years of age or older. The median age was 42 years. For every 100 females, there were 83.7 males. For every 100 females age 18 and over, there were 78.5 males.

The median income for a household in the town was $23,897, and the median income for a family was $29,943. Males had a median income of $22,813 versus $15,625 for females. The per capita income for the town was $14,009. About 13.4% of families and 17.2% of the population were below the poverty line, including 22.6% of those under age 18 and 16.7% of those age 65 or over.

== Education ==
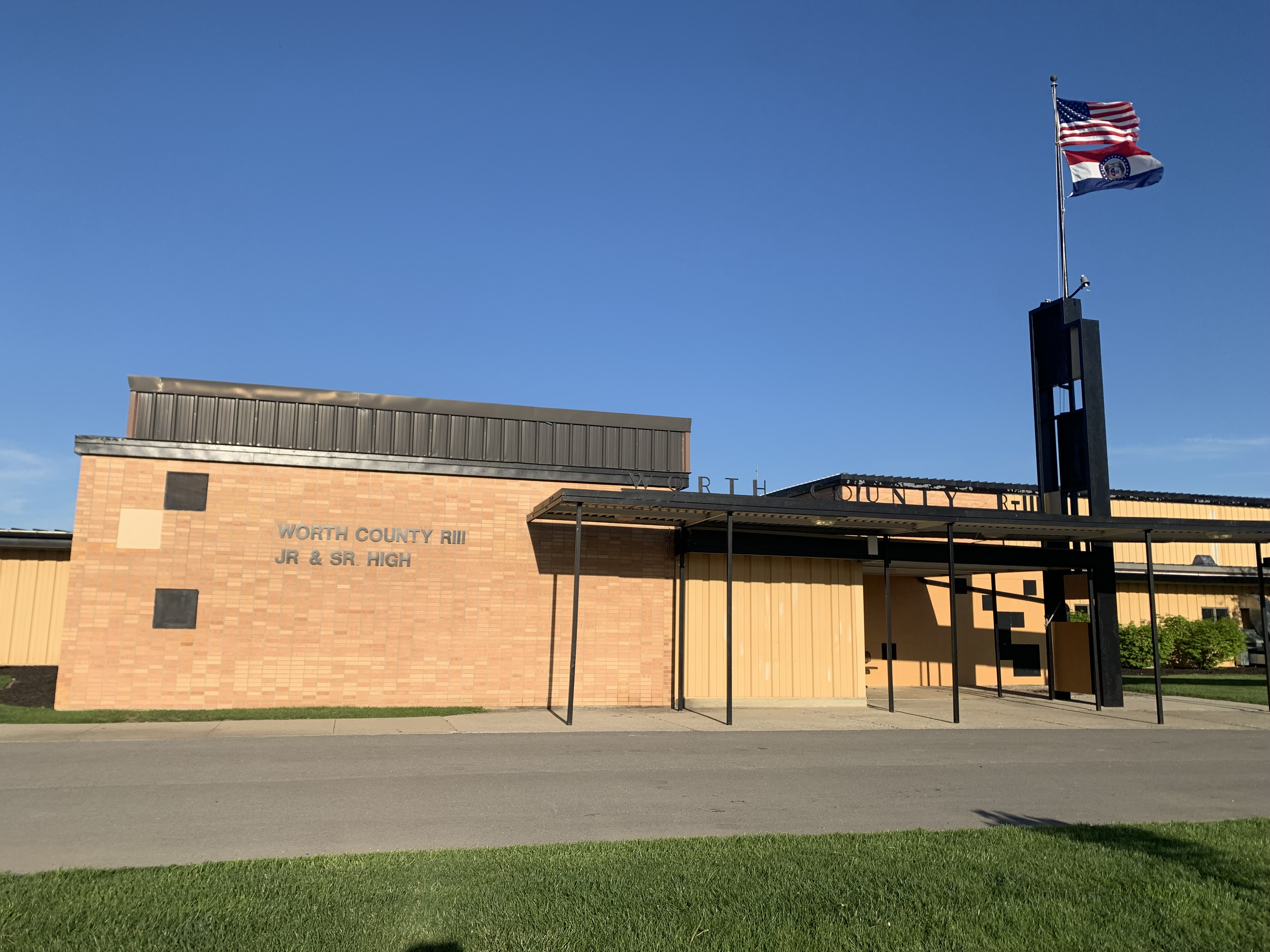
Grant City High School

Public education in Grant City is administered by Worth County R-III School District, which operates one elementary school and Worth County High School.

Grant City has a lending library, the Worth County Library.

== Notable people ==
- Ursula Tibbels Auer (1883–1981), American nurse, businesswoman
- Chet Gardner, racing driver
- Phil S. Gibson, 22nd Chief Justice of California.
- Frank E. Lucas, 13th Governor of Wyoming
- Leon C. Phillips, 11th Governor of Oklahoma
- Ola Elizabeth Winslow, Pulitzer Prize-winning historian, biographer, and educator

== See also ==
- List of municipalities in Missouri
