= Urszula =

Urszula is a given name. Notable people with the name include:

- Franciszka Urszula Radziwiłłowa (1705–1753), Polish-Lithuania-Belarusian noble dramatist and writer
- Urszula Augustyn (born 1964), Polish politician
- Urszula Dudziak (born 1943), Polish jazz vocalist
- Urszula Gacek (born 1963), British-born Polish member of the European Parliament
- Urszula Kasprzak, usually known simply as Urszula (born 1960), Polish singer
- Urszula Kielan (born 1960), retired high jumper from Poland
- Urszula Koszut (1940–2023), Polish operatic soprano
- Urszula Kozioł (1931–2025), Polish poet, writer and dramatist
- Urszula Krupa (born 1949), Polish politician and Member of the European Parliament
- Urszula Mayerin (1570–1635), mistress to King Sigismund III of Poland
- Urszula Modrzyńska (1928–2010), Polish stage and film actress
- Urszula Piwnicka, née Jasińska (born 1983), Polish javelin thrower
- Urszula Plenkiewicz (1921–2021), Polish scout and liaison officer
- Urszula Radwańska (born 1990), Polish tennis player
- Urszula Sadkowska (born 1984), Polish judoka
- Urszula Sipińska (born 1947), Polish singer-songwriter, pianist and architect
- Urszula Urbaniak (born 1967), Polish filmmaker and TV director
- Urszula Włodarczyk (born 1965), retired Polish heptathlete
- Urszula Zamoyska (1750–1808), Polish noblewoman and socialite
- Urszula Zielińska (born 1977), Polish politician

== See also ==
- Ursula (disambiguation)
- Urszulin (disambiguation)
