= Belmont Chasma =

Feature on the Uranian moon Titania

Belmont Chasma is a chasma on Titania, an Uranian moon.

== Geography ==
It is approximately 238 to 258 kilometers in length. It is located in Titania's southern hemisphere & centered at coordinates 8.5° S, 32.6° E. It goes through Ursula Crater.

== Discovery & Naming ==
It was discovered in 1986 by Voyager 2 and was named after a location in the Merchant of Venice.
