= Worth County Courthouse (Missouri) =

- U.S. National Register of Historic Places
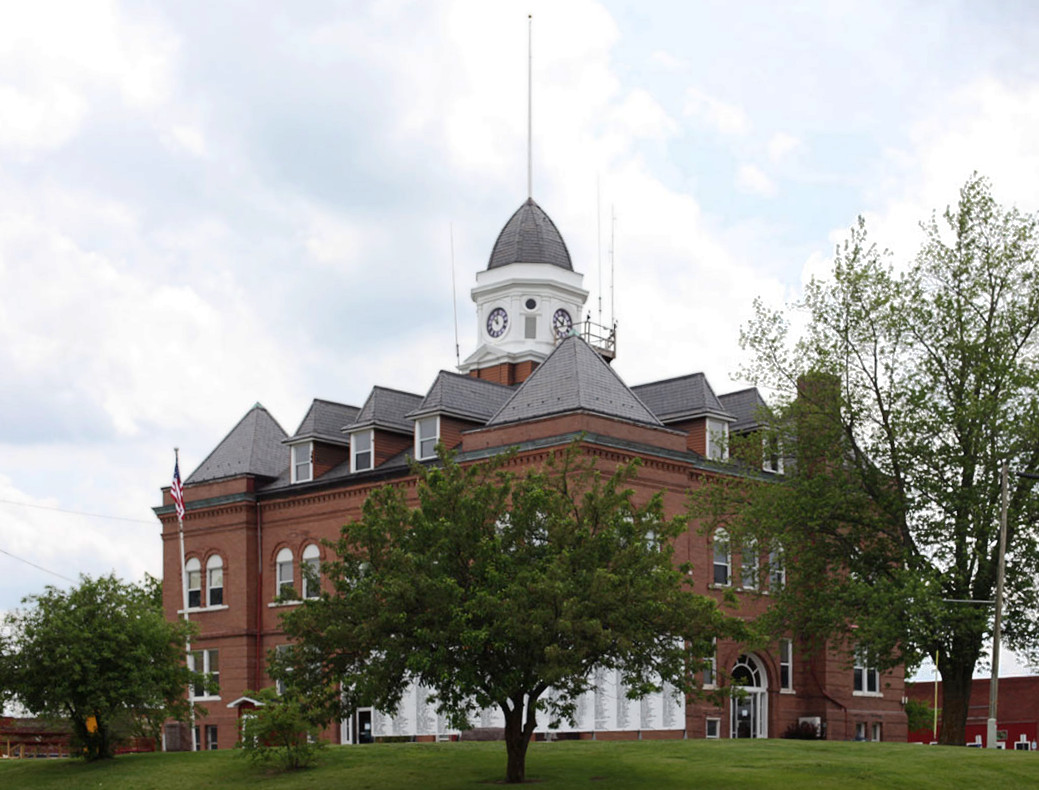
- Worth County Courthouse, May 2014

- Location within Missouri Location within the United States
- Interactive map showing the location for Worth County Courthouse
- Location: Public Square, Grant City, Missouri, U.S.
- Coordinates: 40°29′10″N 94°24′32″W
- Area: less than one acre
- Built: 1898
- Architect: F. J. Tochterman; Orff & Guilbert
- Architectural style: Late 19th and 20th Century Revivals
- NRHP reference No.: 83001056
- Added to NRHP: January 20, 1983

Worth County Courthouse is a historic courthouse located at Grant City, Missouri, United States. It was built in 1898–1899, and is a 2 1/2-story, rectangular, brown brick building with elements of the Classical Revival and Renaissance Revival style. It has a hipped roof with dormers topped by a galvanized iron tower with a clock face on each facade. It has round arched opening and features a portico of three semi-elliptical arches and parapet.

It was listed on the National Register of Historic Places in 1983.
