= Urša =

Urša is a Slovene feminine given name.

It may refer to:

- Urša Bežan, Slovenian swimmer
- Urša Bogataj, Slovenian ski jumper
- Urša Kragelj, Slovenian canoeist
- Urša Pintar, Slovenian cyclist
- Urša Raukar-Gamulin, Croatian actress and activist

== See also ==
- Urška
