= Ursula (crater) =

Impact crater on Uranus's moon Titania

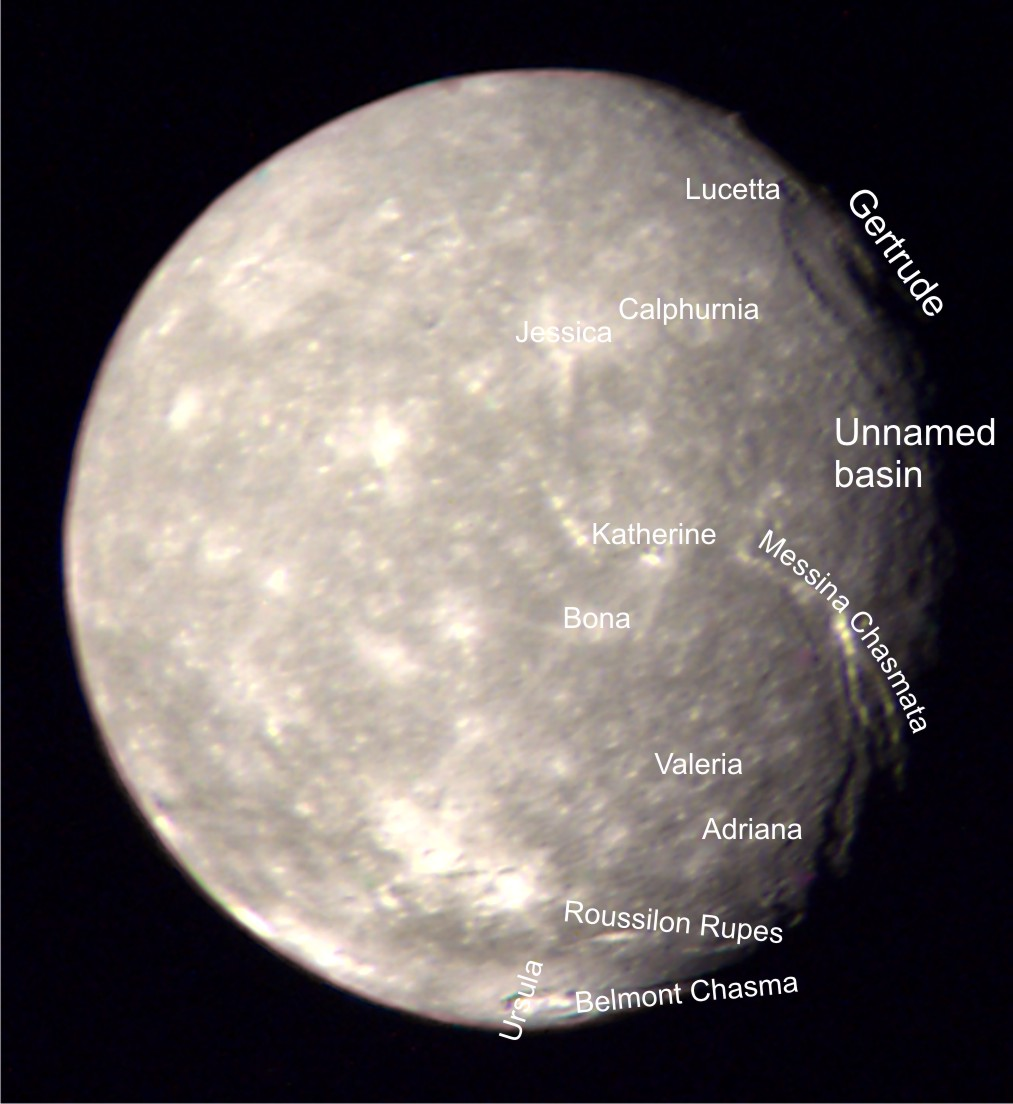
- Ursula is the large bright crater near the bottom of this annotated Voyager 2 image of Titania
- Feature type: Impact crater
- Location: Titania
- Coordinates: 12.40°S 45.20°E
- Diameter: ~135 km (84 mi)
- Discoverer: Voyager 2
- Eponym: Ursula, from Much Ado About Nothing

Ursula is the second-largest impact crater known on Uranus's moon Titania. It is about 135 km across, and is cut by Belmont Chasma. It is named after Hero's attendant in William Shakespeare's comedy Much Ado About Nothing; the name Ursula was officially adopted by the International Astronomical Union (IAU) in 1988. (Note: Features on Titania are named after female Shakespearean characters.)

== Geology and characteristics ==
With a diameter of approximately 135 kilometers, Ursula is the second-largest known impact feature on Titania, after Gertrude. Ursula is disrupted by a series of parallel chasms. The crater has a flat floor, and Ursula has what appears to be a central pit with diameter of about 20 km. However, the structure is more likely to be a series of depressions due to multiple tectonic faults breaking up the crater floor. It is probably one of the youngest large impact craters on Titania. The crater is surrounded by smooth plains, which have the lowest impact crater density of all geological units on the moon, although they are cut by Belmont Chasma. Though the smooth plains could represent an ejecta blanket, with material blasted out from the impact event that created Ursula obliterating nearby craters, the lack of similar deposits around Titania's other large craters suggest a cryovolcanic origin. This makes the regions surrounding Ursula one of the only identified candidate cryovolcanic features on Titania, and may be analogous to the smooth plains of Saturn's moons Dione and Tethys.
