= Orsolya Karalyos =

Hungarian handball player (born 1991)

Personal information
- Full name: Orsolya Karalyos
- Nationality: Hungarian
- Born: 18 May 1991 (age 35) Debrecen, Hungary
- Height: 1.80 m (5 ft 11 in)

Sport
- Sport: Handball
- Position: Right Back
- Current club: Retired

Youth career
- Years: Team
- –2009: Debreceni VSC

Senior clubs
- Years: Team
- 2009–2014: Debreceni VSC
- loan: → Gyöngyösi FKK
- 2014–2017: Budaörs Handball
- 2017–2018: Kecskeméti NKSE
- 2018–2019: Kispest NKK
- 2019–: Komáromi VSE

Orsolya Karalyos (born 18 May 1991 in Debrecen) is a former Hungarian handballer.

== Achievements ==
- Nemzeti Bajnokság I:
  - Silver Medallist: 2010, 2011
- Magyar Kupa:
  - Silver Medallist: 2011
