= Kavadar =

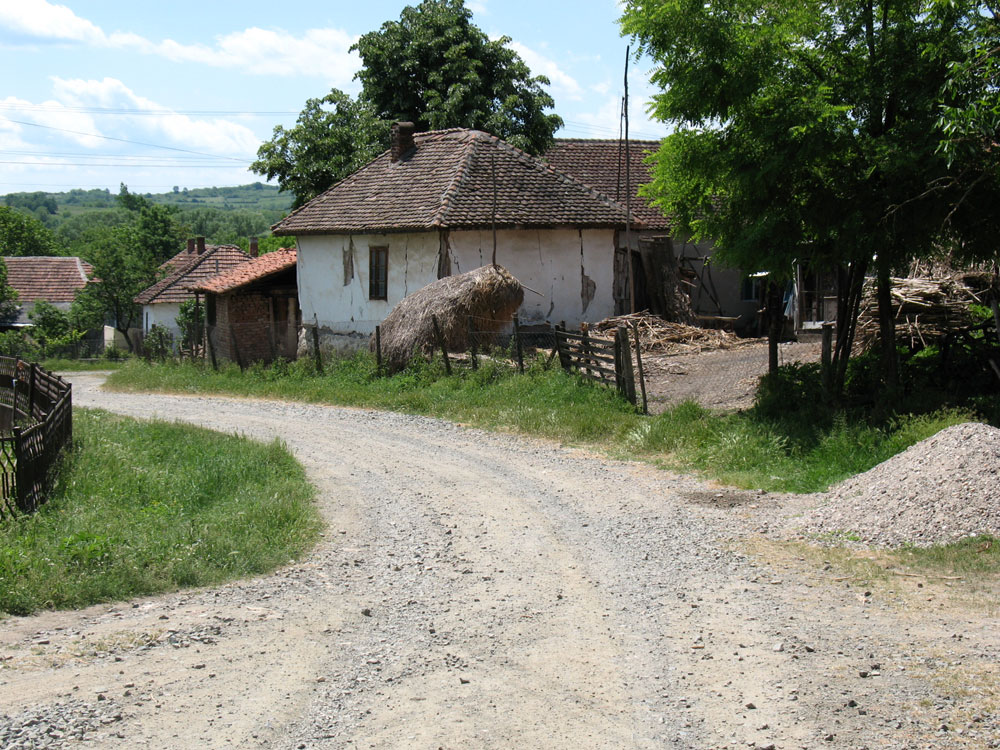

Kavadar (Serbian Cyrillic: Кавадар) is a village in Šumadija and Western Serbia (Šumadija), in the municipality of Rekovac (Region of Levač), lying at 43°50′16″N 21°07′54″E, at the elevation of 215 m. According to the 2002 census, the village had 456 citizens, while according to the 2022 census, the village had 311 citizens.
