= Gertrude (crater) =

Largest known impact crater on Titania

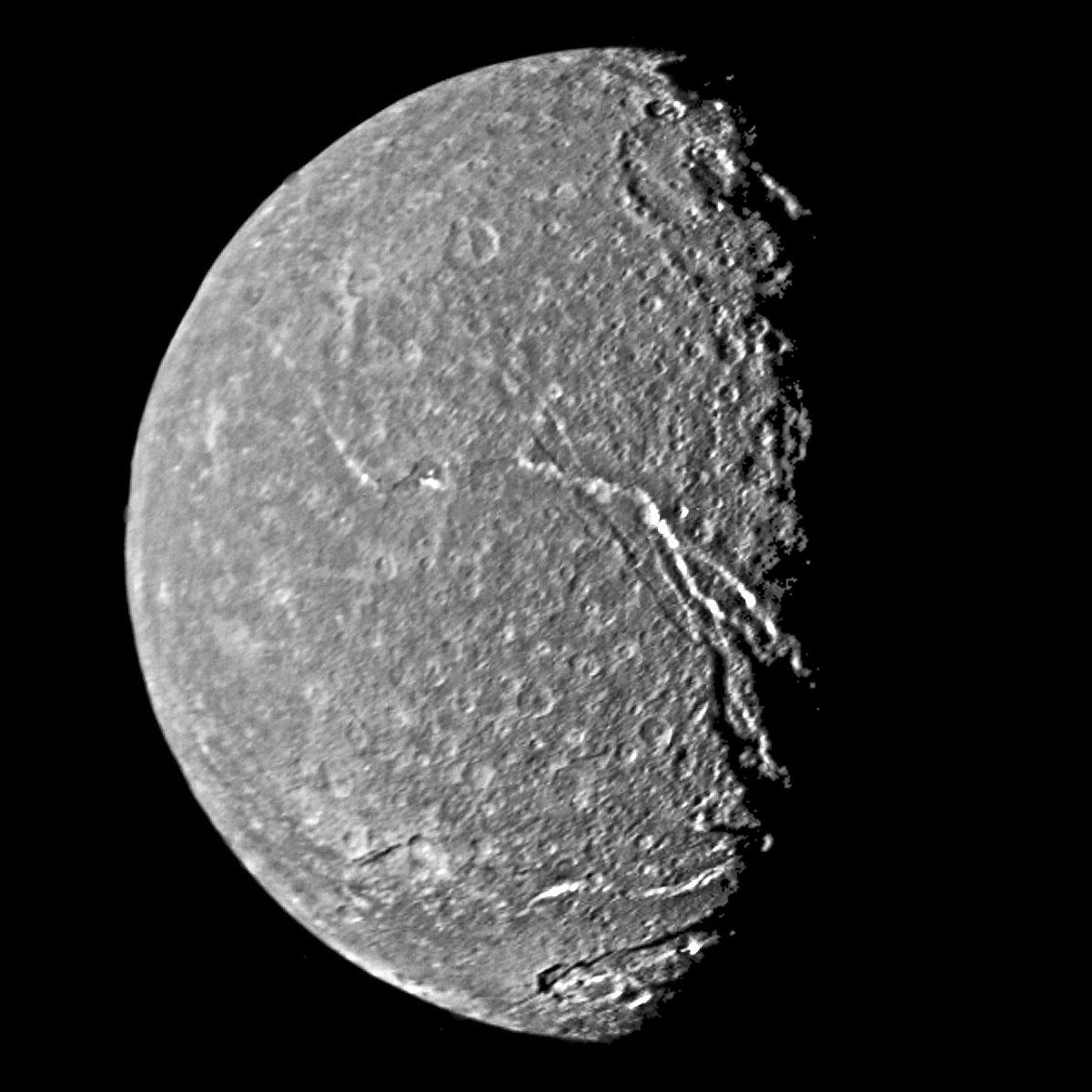
- Gertrude is the large crater near the top of this Voyager 2 image.
- Feature type: Peak-ring impact basin
- Location: Titania
- Coordinates: 15.80°S 72.90°W
- Diameter: ~326 km (203 mi) (GPN); 400 ± 15 km (248.5 ± 9.3 mi) (Moore et al.)
- Depth: ~1–3 km (0.62–1.86 mi)
- Discoverer: Voyager 2
- Eponym: Gertrude, mother of Prince Hamlet

Gertrude /ˈɡɜːrtruːd/ is the largest known crater on Uranus's moon Titania. A peak-ring impact basin, it is roughly 326–400 kilometers across, 1/5 to 1/4 of Titania's diameter. (Note: Titania's diameter is 1576.8 ± 1.2 km. Crater-diameter ratios are given by dividing the impact crater diameter by the object's bulk diameter. Using a diameter of 326 kilometers from the Gazetteer of Planetary Nomenclature yields a crater-diameter ratio of 0.207; using a diameter of 400 kilometers from Moore and collaborators yields a crater-diameter ratio of 0.254.) Gertrude was first observed by the Voyager 2 spacecraft on its January 1986 flyby of the Uranian system. It is named after Gertrude, the mother of Prince Hamlet in William Shakespeare's play Hamlet. The name Gertrude was officially adopted by the International Astronomical Union (IAU) in 1988. Features on Titania are named after female Shakespearean characters.

== Geology and characteristics ==
Gertrude's depth was estimated to be roughly 1–3 kilometers by planetary scientist P. M. Schenk in 1989. The crater rim of Gertrude is elevated by 2 km over the crater floor. In the center of the crater there is a large dome, which resulted from the uplift of the surface immediately after the impact. The dome has the diameter of about 150 km and is 2–3 km high. The rim and dome are low for crater with such a large diameter indicating that the relief has relaxed since the impact. The surface of the dome has only few superimposed smaller craters, which means that it was modified later. Linear ridges cut across Gertude and the nearby Messina Chasmata. Gertrude is additionally surrounded by plains with less cratering compared to much of Titania's surface, likely representing Gertrude's ancient ejecta blanket.

Gertrude is unusually shallow; extrapolating from depth-to-diameter (d/D) ratios of smaller craters on Titania, Gertrude's original depth may have been ~6–6.5 km. This implies that Gertrude underwent a period of relaxation, where the crust slowly creeps and gradually mutes topographical extremes. The central doming of Gertrude's floor is indicative of relaxation; Gertrude's floor appears similar to the central domed floor of a large relaxed crater on Saturn's moon Rhea, Tirawa.
