= Urszulin =

Urszulin may refer to the following places:

- Urszulin, Kuyavian-Pomeranian Voivodeship (north-central Poland)
- Urszulin, Łódź Voivodeship (central Poland)
- Urszulin, Lublin County in Lublin Voivodeship (east Poland)
- Urszulin, Ryki County in Lublin Voivodeship (east Poland)
- Urszulin, Włodawa County in Lublin Voivodeship (east Poland)
- Urszulin, Masovian Voivodeship (east-central Poland)
