= Ola Elizabeth Winslow =

American historian (1885–1977)

- Born: January 5, 1885; Grant City, Missouri
- Died: September 27, 1977 (aged 92); Damariscotta, Maine

Ola Elizabeth Winslow (January 5, 1885 in Grant City, Missouri – September 27, 1977 in Damariscotta, Maine) was an American historian, biographer, and educator. She won a Pulitzer Prize in 1941 for her biography of Jonathan Edwards, an 18th-century American theologian whose basic writings she edited for Signet Classics.

Born in Grant City, Missouri, Winslow was an instructor at College of the Pacific from 1909 to 1914, when she earned a master's degree from Stanford University. She was professor of English at Goucher College in Baltimore (1914–1944) and at Wellesley College (1944–1977, emeritus after 1950).

Winslow earned a Ph.D. from the University of Chicago in 1922 with a thesis that was later published as a book with the title Low Comedy as a Structural Element in English Drama from the Beginnings to 1642.

Winslow died in Maine at age 92.

== Books ==
- Low Comedy as a Structural Element in English Drama from the Beginnings to 1642 (Menasha, WI, 1926) – "originally presented as the author's thesis, University of Chicago, 1922"
- Jonathan Edwards, 1703–1758: A Biography (Macmillan, 1940) – 1941 Pulitzer Prize for Biography or Autobiography
- Meetinghouse Hill, 1630–1783 (Macmillan, 1952) – about the Dorchester church and settlement, now in Boston
- Master Roger Williams: a biography (Macmillan, 1957)
- John Bunyan (Macmillan, 1961) – biography of John Bunyan
- Samuel Sewall of Boston (Macmillan, 1964)
- Portsmouth: the life of a town (Macmillan, 1966)
- John Eliot, apostle to the Indians (Houghton Mifflin, 1968)
- "And plead for the rights of all": Old South Church in Boston, 1669–1969 (Boston: Nimrod, 1970)
- A Destroying Angel: The Conquest of Smallpox in Colonial Boston (Houghton Mifflin, 1974)

As editor

- Harper's Literary Museum (Harper & Bros, 1927), compiled by Winslow – Subject: American literature—Colonial period, ca. 1600–1775 – first of a series designed by George Boas, not continued – reissued as Harper's literary museum, a compendium of instructive, entertaining, and amusing matter, selected from early American writings (Arno, 1972)
- American Broadside Verse from Imprints of the 17th & 18th Centuries (Yale University Press, 1930), selected and edited with an introduction by Winslow
- Jonathan Edwards: basic writings, selected and edited with a foreword by Winslow (New American Library, Signet Classics, 1966)
- The Pilgrim's Progress: with a critical and biographical profile of the author by Ola Elizabeth Winslow (Grolier, The World's Great Classics, 1968), Grolier Edition of the 1820 classic by John Bunyan
