= Ursula Strozynski =

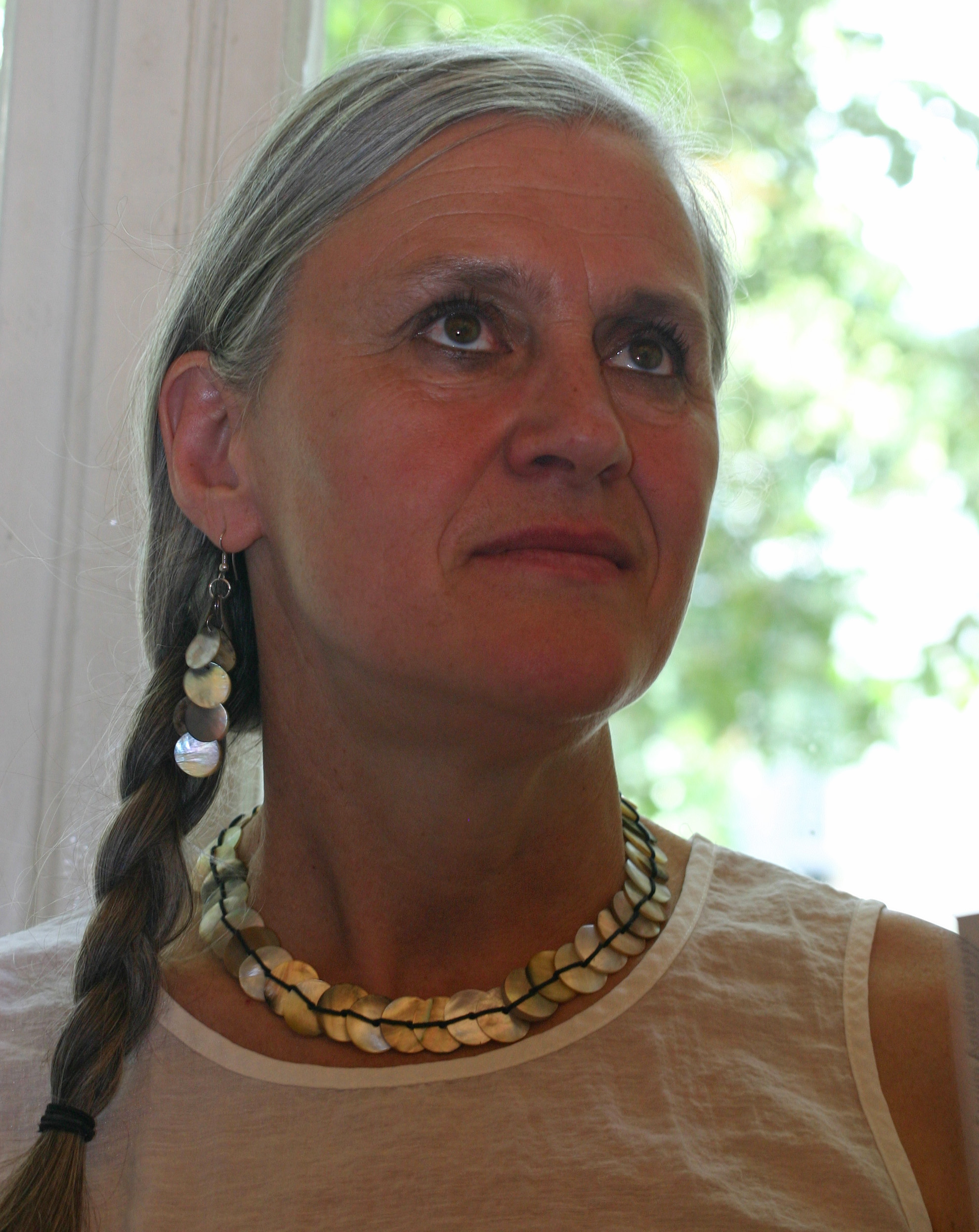
Image of Ursula Strozynski

Ursula Strozynski (born 11 January 1954 in Dingelstädt) is a German painter and graphic artist.

== Life ==
Ursula Strozynski studied architecture at the Technische Universität Dresden from 1972 to 1976. From 1976 to 1977 she worked on the project planning of a large Berlin company. Since then she has lived in Berlin-Pankow as a freelance artist. In 1992, together with Marguerite Blume-Cárdenas, Elli Graetz, Annet Gröschner, Gisela Kurkhaus-Müller and Nuria Quevedo, among others, she founded the Künstlerinnen-Initiative Xanthippe e.V.

Through her studies and her work afterwards, she has a preference for graphics, etchings and paintings of industrial plants and buildings as well as other architecturally interesting themes. As a long-standing lecturer at the Marburg Summer Academy up to the present day (2012), she passes on her experience. Her works were part of the Marburger Kunstverein's group exhibition Bildersuchen.

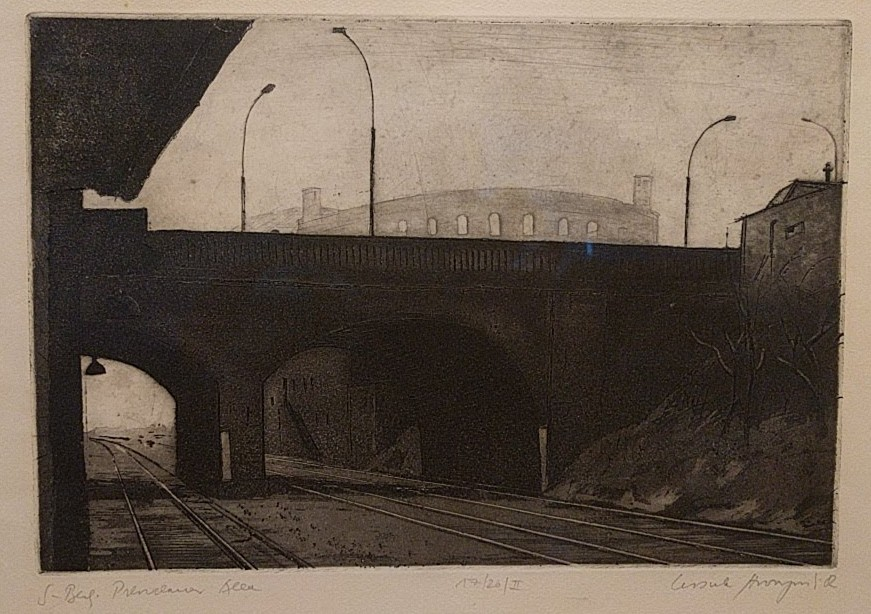
Prenzlauer Allee S-Bahn station 1982

Since 1981 she has had regular personal exhibitions and has also taken part in international exhibitions. Her works can be found in the Nationalgalerie Berlin, the Kunstarchiv Beeskow, the Kunstsammlung Berlin Marzahn-Hellersdorf, the Stiftung Stadtmuseum Berlin, the Ludwig Galerie Schloss Oberhausen and the Jüdisches Museum New York.

== Representation of Ursula Strozynski in the visual arts (selection) ==
- Ellen Fuhr: Ursula Strozynski (etching, 1987)
- Christian Borchert: The painter Ursula Strozynski in front of one of her works (several photographs; 1996)

== Works (selection) ==
- 1979 Ostkreuz (Aquatint)
- 1984 Jüdischer Friedhof (aquatint etching)
- 1986 Mitropa-Pub (etching)
- 1991 Wall II (watercolour)
- 1995 Cemetery in Winter (drypoint etching)
- 2002 Mountains (series, Monotype)

== Solo exhibitions ==
- 1981 Berlin, Kleine Humboldt-Galerie
- 1986 Frankfurt (Oder), Galerie Junge Kunst
- 1990 Berlin, Galerie Eva Poll
- 1994 Hamburg, Galerie Rose
- 1997 Bautzen, Galerie Budyssin
- 1999 Berlin, Galerie Inselstraße
- 1999 Berlin, Forum Amalienpark
- 2001 Berlin, Galerie Sophien-Edition
- 2003 Berlin, Galerie 100
- 2004 Berlin, Galerie Vagt
- 2006 Berlin, Forum am Amalienpark
- 2013 Berlin, Galerie Pankow
- 2019 Manfred Butzmann and Ursula Strozynski, Kunstpavillon Heringsdorf

Furthermore, her works were shown at numerous group exhibitions. At the IX. and X. Art Exhibition of the GDR in Dresden she was represented with several works.

== Literature ==
- Strozynski, Ursula. In: Dietmar Eisold (ed.): Lexikon Künstler in der DDR. Verlag Neues Leben, Berlin, 2010. ISBN 978-3-355-01761-9, p. 936
