= Urška =

Urška is a Slovene feminine given name.

It may refer to:

- Urška Arlič Gololičič, Slovenian opera singer
- Urška Bratuša, Slovenian football player
- Urška Bravec, Slovenian cyclist
- Urška Bračko, Slovenian model
- Urška Hrovat, Slovenian skier
- Urška Poje, Slovenian biathlete
- Urška Rabič, Slovenian skier
- Urška Vesenjak, Slovenian tennis player
- Urška Žigart, Slovenian cyclist
- Urška Žolnir, Slovenian judoka

== See also ==
- Urša
