= Titania (moon) =

Largest moon of Uranus

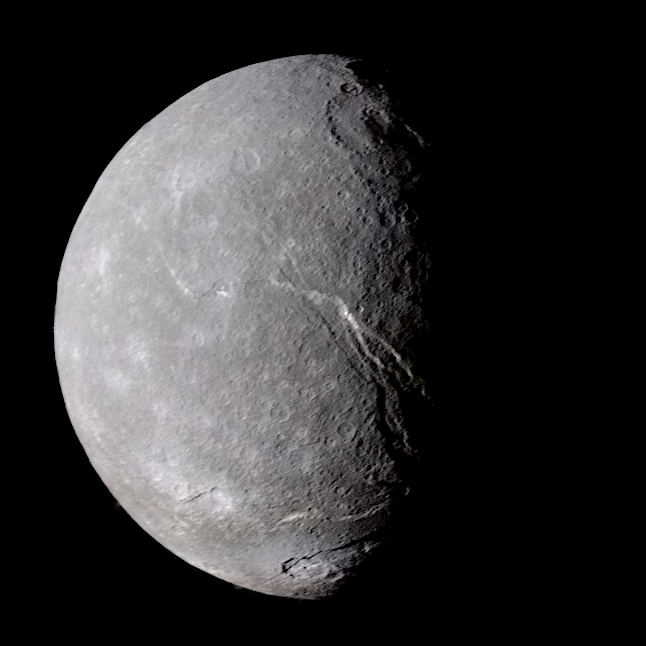
- Colorised grayscale image of Titania from Voyager 2, January 1986

Discovery
- Discovered by: William Herschel
- Discovery date: January 11, 1787

Designations
- Designation: Uranus III
- Pronunciation: /təˈtɑːniə, təˈteɪniə/
- Adjectives: Titanian /təˈtɑːniən/ (Note: Spelled the same as the adjectival form of Saturn's moon Titan, but may be pronounced differently.)

Orbital characteristics
- Semi-major axis: 436298 km
- Eccentricity: 0.0016
- Orbital period (sidereal): 8.705869 d
- Average orbital speed: 3.64 km/s (Note: Calculated on the basis of other parameters.)
- Inclination: 0.114° (to Uranus's equator)
- Satellite of: Uranus

Physical characteristics
- Mean radius: 788.4±0.6 km (0.1235 Earths)
- Surface area: (7.811±0.012)×10^{6} km^{2} (Note: Surface area derived from the radius r : 4πr².)
- Volume: (2.0527±0.0047)×10^{9} km^{3} (Note: Volume v derived from the radius r : 4πr^{3}/3.)
- Mass: (3.338±0.022)×10^{21} kg (Note: Calculated from its standard gravitational parameter GM = 222.80±1.45 km^{3}/s^{2}.)
- Mean density: 1.63±0.01 g/cm^{3} (calculated)
- Surface gravity: 0.358 m/s² (Note: Surface gravity derived from the mass m, the gravitational constant G and the radius r : Gm/r².)
- Escape velocity: 0.752 km/s (Note: Escape velocity derived from the mass m, the gravitational constant G and the radius r : √2Gm/r.)
- Synodic rotation period: synchronous
- Albedo: 0.346 ± 0.020 (geometric; V); 0.170 ± 0.015 (Bond)
| Surface temp. | min | mean | max |
|---|---|---|---|
| solstice | 60 K | 70 ± 7 K | 89 K |
- Apparent magnitude: 13.47–13.51 (± 0.04)
- Absolute magnitude (H): 0.76–0.80 (± 0.04)

Atmosphere
- Surface pressure: <1–2 mPa (10–20 nbar)
- Composition by volume: carbon dioxide (?); nitrogen (?); methane (?)

Titania (/tɪˈtɑːniə, -ˈteɪ-/) is the largest moon of Uranus and the eighth-largest moon in the Solar System, with a diameter of 1,576 km (980 mi). Discovered by William Herschel in 1787, it is named after the queen of the fairies in Shakespeare's A Midsummer Night's Dream. Its orbit lies inside Uranus's magnetosphere.

Titania consists of approximately equal amounts of ice and rock, and is probably differentiated into a rocky core and an icy mantle. A layer of liquid water may be present at the core–mantle boundary. Its surface, which is relatively dark and slightly red in color, appears to have been shaped by both impacts and endogenic processes. Although Titania is covered with numerous impact craters reaching up to 326 kilometres (203 mi) in diameter, it is less heavily cratered than Oberon, the outermost of Uranus's five large moons.

It may have undergone an early endogenic resurfacing event which obliterated its older, heavily cratered surface. The surface is cut by a system of enormous canyons and scarps, the result of the expansion of its interior during the later stages of its evolution. Like all major moons of Uranus, Titania probably formed from an accretion disk which surrounded the planet just after its formation. Uranus and Neptune (and thus their moons) may both appear apparent retrograde orbits when viewed from Earth.

Infrared spectroscopy conducted from 2001 to 2005 revealed the presence of water ice as well as frozen carbon dioxide on Titania's surface, suggesting it may have a tenuous carbon dioxide atmosphere with a surface pressure of about 10 nanopascals (10^{−13} bar). Measurements during Titania's occultation of a star put an upper limit on the surface pressure of any possible atmosphere at 1–2 mPa (10–20 nbar). The Uranian system has been studied up close only once, by the spacecraft Voyager 2 in January 1986. It took several images of Titania, which allowed mapping of about 40% of its surface.

== Discovery and naming ==
Titania was discovered by William Herschel on January 11, 1787, the same day he discovered Uranus's second largest moon, Oberon. He later reported the discoveries of four more satellites, although they were subsequently revealed as spurious. For nearly the next 50 years, Titania and Oberon would not be observed by any instrument other than William Herschel's, although the moon can be seen from Earth with a present-day high-end amateur telescope.

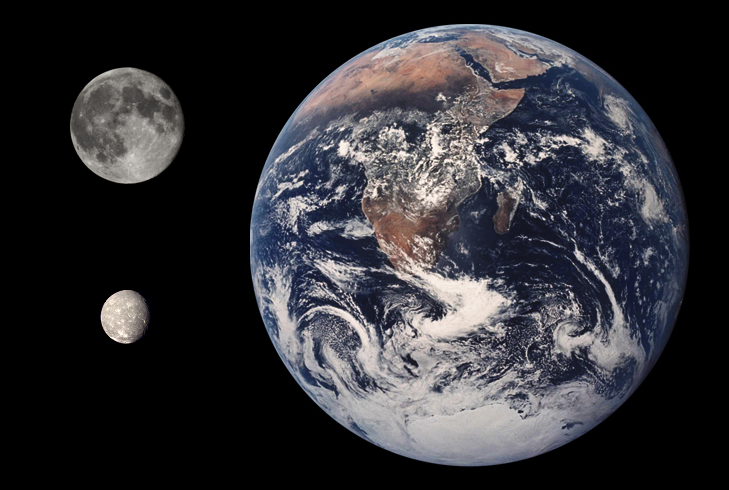
Size comparison of Earth, the Moon, and Titania

All of Uranus's moons are named after characters created by William Shakespeare or Alexander Pope. The name Titania was taken from the Queen of the Fairies in A Midsummer Night's Dream. The names of all four satellites of Uranus then known were suggested by Herschel's son John in 1852, at the request of William Lassell, who had discovered the other two moons, Ariel and Umbriel, the year before. It is uncertain if Herschel devised the names, or if Lassell did so and then sought Herschel's permission.

Titania was initially referred to as "the first satellite of Uranus", and in 1848 was given the designation Uranus I by William Lassell, although he sometimes used William Herschel's numbering (where Titania and Oberon are II and IV). In 1851 Lassell eventually numbered all four known satellites in order of their distance from the planet by Roman numerals, and since then Titania has been designated Uranus III.

Shakespeare's character's name is pronounced /tɪˈteɪnjə/, but the moon is often pronounced /taɪˈteɪniə/, by analogy with the familiar chemical element titanium. The adjectival form, Titanian, is homonymous with that of Saturn's moon Titan. The name Titania is ancient Greek for "Daughter of the Titans".

Planetary moons other than Earth's were never given symbols in the astronomical literature. Denis Moskowitz, a software engineer who designed most of the dwarf planet symbols, proposed a T (the initial of Titania) combined with the low globe of Jérôme Lalande's Uranus symbol as the symbol of Titania. This symbol is not widely used.

== Orbit ==
Titania orbits Uranus at the distance of about 436,000 kilometres (271,000 mi), being the second farthest from the planet among its five major moons after Oberon. (Note: The five major moons are Miranda, Ariel, Umbriel, Titania and Oberon.) Titania's orbit has a small eccentricity and is inclined very little relative to the equator of Uranus. Its orbital period is around 8.7 days, coincident with its rotational period. In other words, Titania is a synchronous or tidally locked satellite, with one face always pointing toward the planet.

Titania's orbit lies completely inside the Uranian magnetosphere. This is important, because the trailing hemispheres of satellites orbiting inside a magnetosphere are struck by magnetospheric plasma, which co-rotates with the planet. This bombardment may lead to the darkening of the trailing hemispheres, which is actually observed for all Uranian moons except Oberon (see below).

Because Uranus orbits the Sun almost on its side, and its moons orbit in the planet's equatorial plane, they (including Titania) are subject to an extreme seasonal cycle. Both northern and southern poles spend 42 years in a complete darkness, and another 42 years in continuous sunlight, with the sun rising close to the zenith over one of the poles at each solstice. The Voyager 2 flyby coincided with the southern hemisphere's 1986 summer solstice, when nearly the entire southern hemisphere was illuminated. Once every 42 years, when Uranus has an equinox and its equatorial plane intersects the Earth, mutual occultations of Uranus's moons become possible. In 2007–2008 a number of such events were observed including two occultations of Titania by Umbriel on August 15 and December 8, 2007.

== Composition and internal structure ==
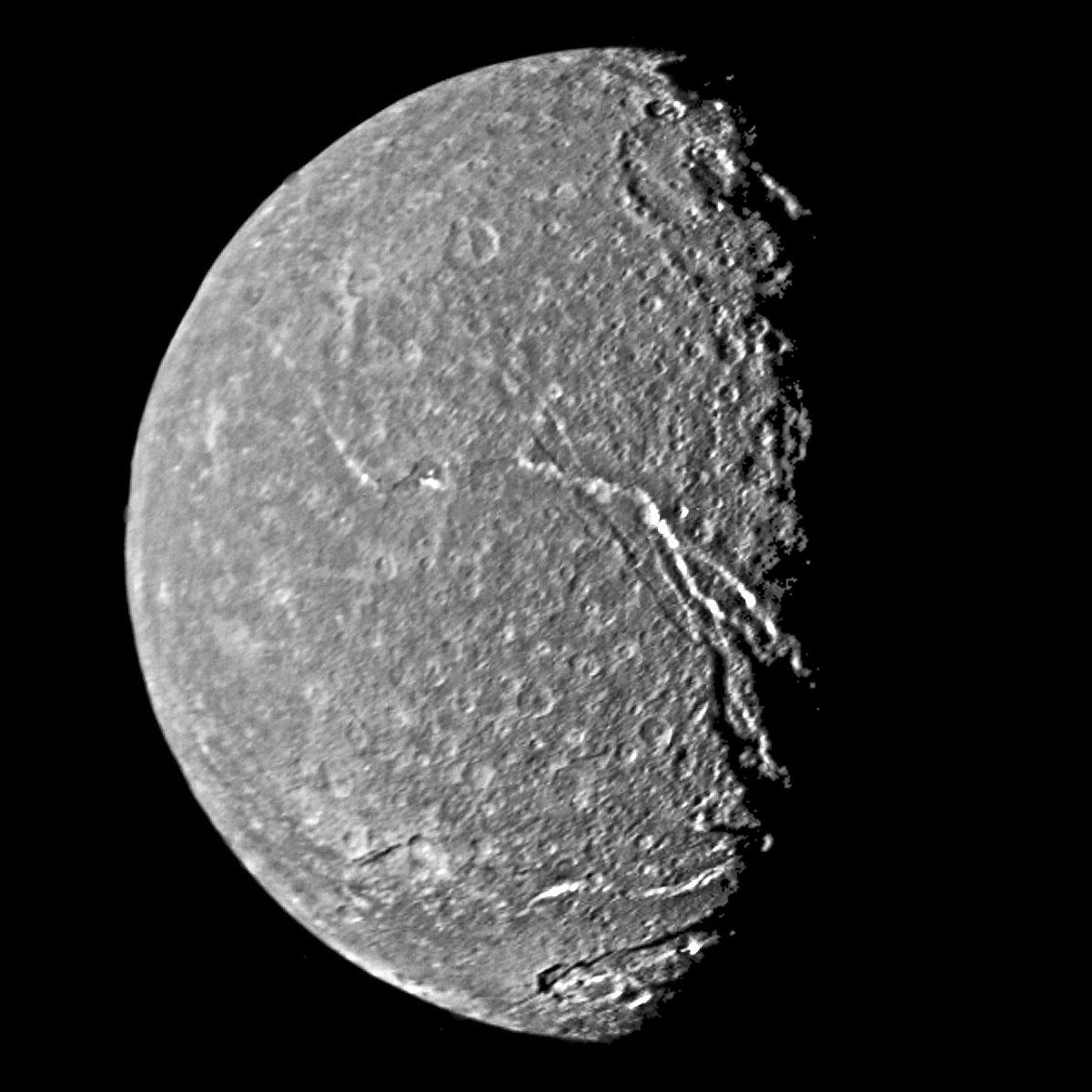
Voyager 2's highest-resolution image of Titania shows moderately cratered plains, enormous rifts and long scarps. Near the bottom, a region of smoother plains including the crater Ursula is split by the graben Belmont Chasma.

Titania is the largest and most massive Uranian moon, the eighth most massive moon in the Solar System, and the 20th largest object in the Solar System. (Note: The seven moons more massive than Titania are Ganymede, Titan, Callisto, Io, Earth's Moon, Europa, and Triton.) Its density of 1.63 g/cm^{3}, which is much higher than the typical density of Saturn's satellites, indicates that it consists of roughly equal proportions of water ice and dense non-ice components; the latter could be made of rock and carbonaceous material including heavy organic compounds. The presence of water ice is supported by infrared spectroscopic observations made in 2001–2005, which have revealed crystalline water ice on the surface of the moon. Water ice absorption bands are slightly stronger on Titania's leading hemisphere than on the trailing hemisphere. This is the opposite of what is observed on Oberon, where the trailing hemisphere exhibits stronger water ice signatures. The cause of this asymmetry is not known, but it may be related to the bombardment by charged particles from the magnetosphere of Uranus, which is stronger on the trailing hemisphere (due to the plasma's co-rotation). The energetic particles tend to sputter water ice, decompose methane trapped in ice as clathrate hydrate and darken other organics, leaving a dark, carbon-rich residue behind.

Except for water, the only other compound identified on the surface of Titania by infrared spectroscopy is carbon dioxide, which is concentrated mainly on the trailing hemisphere. The origin of the carbon dioxide is not completely clear. It might be produced locally from carbonates or organic materials under the influence of the solar ultraviolet radiation or energetic charged particles coming from the magnetosphere of Uranus. The latter process would explain the asymmetry in its distribution, because the trailing hemisphere is subject to a more intense magnetospheric influence than the leading hemisphere. Another possible source is the outgassing of the primordial CO_{2} trapped by water ice in Titania's interior. The escape of CO_{2} from the interior may be related to the past geological activity on this moon.

Titania may be differentiated into a rocky core surrounded by an icy mantle. If this is the case, the radius of the core 520 kilometres (320 mi) is about 66% of the radius of the moon, and its mass is around 58% of the moon's mass—the proportions are dictated by moon's composition. The pressure in the center of Titania is about 0.58 GPa (5.8 kbar). The current state of the icy mantle is unclear. If the ice contains enough ammonia or other antifreeze, Titania may have a subsurface ocean at the core–mantle boundary. The thickness of this ocean, if it exists, is up to 50 kilometres (31 mi) and its temperature is around 190 K (close to the water–ammonia eutectic temperature of 176 K). However the present internal structure of Titania depends heavily on its thermal history, which is poorly known. Recent studies suggest, contrary to earlier theories, that Uranus largest moons like Titania in fact could have active subsurface oceans.

== Surface features ==
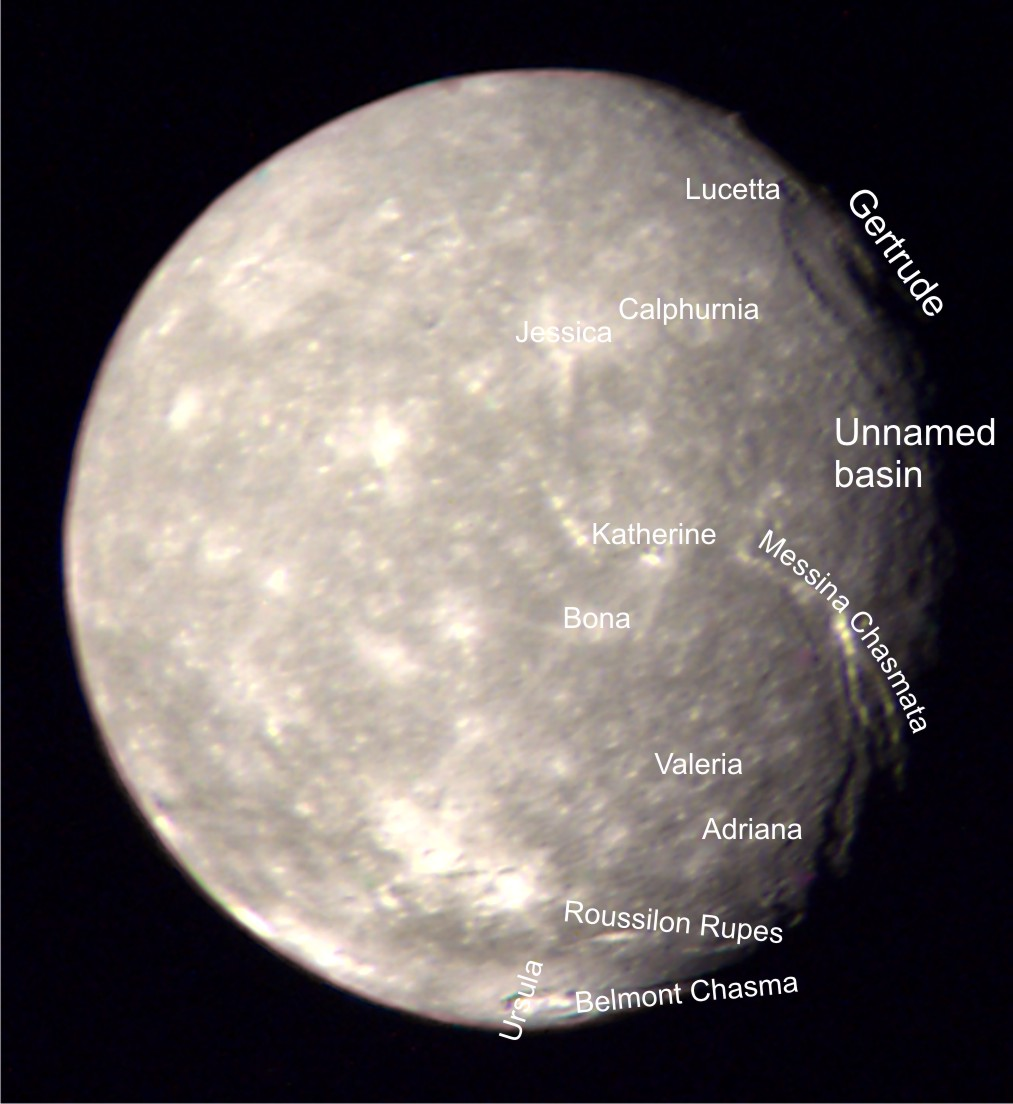
Titania with some surface features labeled. The south pole is situated close to the unlabeled bright crater below and left of the crater Jessica.

Among Uranus's moons, Titania is intermediate in brightness between the dark Oberon and Umbriel and the bright Ariel and Miranda. Its surface shows a strong opposition surge: its reflectivity decreases from 35% at a phase angle of 0° (geometrical albedo) to 25% at an angle of about 1°. Titania has a relatively low Bond albedo of about 17%. Its surface is generally slightly red in color, but less red than that of Oberon. However, fresh impact deposits are bluer, while the smooth plains situated on the leading hemisphere near Ursula crater and along some grabens are somewhat redder. There may be an asymmetry between the leading and trailing hemispheres; the former appears to be redder than the latter by 8%. (Note: The color is determined by the ratio of albedos viewed through the green (0.52–0.59 μm) and violet (0.38–0.45 μm) Voyager filters.) However, this difference is related to the smooth plains and may be accidental. The reddening of the surfaces probably results from space weathering caused by bombardment by charged particles and micrometeorites over the age of the Solar System. However, the color asymmetry of Titania is more likely related to accretion of a reddish material coming from outer parts of the Uranian system, possibly, from irregular satellites, which would be deposited predominately on the leading hemisphere.

Scientists have recognized three classes of geological feature on Titania: craters, chasmata (canyons) and rupes (scarps). The surface of Titania is less heavily cratered than the surfaces of either Oberon or Umbriel, which means that the surface is much younger. The crater diameters reach 326 kilometers for the largest known crater, Gertrude (there can be also a degraded basin of approximately the same size). Some craters (for instance, Ursula and Jessica) are surrounded by bright impact ejecta (rays) consisting of relatively fresh ice. All large craters on Titania have flat floors and central peaks. The only exception is Ursula, which has a pit in the center. To the west of Gertrude there is an area with irregular topography, the so-called "unnamed basin", which may be another highly degraded impact basin with the diameter of about 330 kilometres (210 mi).

Titania's surface is intersected by a system of enormous faults, or scarps. In some places, two parallel scarps mark depressions in the satellite's crust, forming grabens, which are sometimes called canyons. The most prominent among Titania's canyons is Messina Chasma, which runs for about 1,500 kilometres (930 mi) from the equator almost to the south pole. The grabens on Titania are 20–50 kilometres (12–31 mi) wide and have a relief of about 2–5 km. The scarps that are not related to canyons are called rupes, such as Rousillon Rupes near Ursula crater. The regions along some scarps and near Ursula appear smooth at Voyager's image resolution. These smooth plains were probably resurfaced later in Titania's geological history, after the majority of craters formed. The resurfacing may have been either endogenic in nature, involving the eruption of fluid material from the interior (cryovolcanism), or, alternatively it may be due to blanking by the impact ejecta from nearby large craters. The grabens are probably the youngest geological features on Titania—they cut all craters and even smooth plains.

The geology of Titania was influenced by two competing forces: impact crater formation and endogenic resurfacing. The former acted over the moon's entire history and influenced all surfaces. The latter processes were also global in nature, but active mainly for a period following the moon's formation. They obliterated the original heavily cratered terrain, explaining the relatively low number of impact craters on the moon's present-day surface. Additional episodes of resurfacing may have occurred later and led to the formation of smooth plains. Alternatively smooth plains may be ejecta blankets of the nearby impact craters. The most recent endogenous processes were mainly tectonic in nature and caused the formation of the canyons, which are actually giant cracks in the ice crust. The cracking of the crust was caused by the global expansion of Titania by about 0.7%.

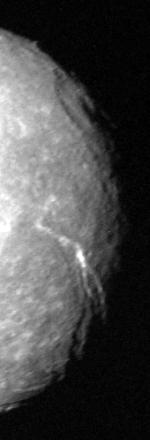
Messina Chasma—a large canyon on Titania

Named surface features on Titania
| Feature | Named after | Type | Length (diameter), km | Coordinates |
|---|---|---|---|---|
| Belmont Chasma | Belmont, Italy (The Merchant of Venice) | Chasma | 238 | 8.5°S 32.6°E |
| Messina Chasmata | Messina, Italy (Much Ado About Nothing) | Chasma | 1,492 | 33.3°S 335°E |
| Rousillon Rupes | Roussillon, France (All's Well That Ends Well) | Rupes | 402 | 14.7°S 23.5°E |
| Adriana | Adriana (The Comedy of Errors) | Crater | 50 | 20.1°S 3.9°E |
| Bona | Bona (Henry VI, Part 3) | Crater | 51 | 55.8°S 351.2°E |
| Calphurnia | Calpurnia Pisonis (Julius Caesar) | Crater | 100 | 42.4°S 291.4°E |
| Elinor | Eleanor of Aquitaine (The Life and Death of King John) | Crater | 74 | 44.8°S 333.6°E |
| Gertrude | Gertrude (Hamlet) | Crater | 326 | 15.8°S 287.1°E |
| Imogen | Imogen (Cymbeline) | Crater | 28 | 23.8°S 321.2°E |
| Iras | Iras (Antony and Cleopatra) | Crater | 33 | 19.2°S 338.8°E |
| Jessica | Jessica (The Merchant of Venice) | Crater | 64 | 55.3°S 285.9°E |
| Katherine | Katherine (Henry VIII) | Crater | 75 | 51.2°S 331.9°E |
| Lucetta | Lucetta (The Two Gentlemen of Verona) | Crater | 58 | 14.7°S 277.1°E |
| Marina | Marina (Pericles, Prince of Tyre) | Crater | 40 | 15.5°S 316°E |
| Mopsa | Mopsa (The Winter's Tale) | Crater | 101 | 11.9°S 302.2°E |
| Phrynia | Phrynia (Timon of Athens) | Crater | 35 | 24.3°S 309.2°E |
| Ursula | Ursula (Much Ado About Nothing) | Crater | 135 | 12.4°S 45.2°E |
| Valeria | Valeria (Coriolanus) | Crater | 59 | 34.5°S 4.2°E |
Surface features on Titania are named for female characters or locations from Shakespeare's works.

== Atmosphere ==
The presence of carbon dioxide on the surface suggests that Titania may have a tenuous seasonal atmosphere of CO_{2}, much like that of the Jovian moon Callisto. (Note: The partial pressure of CO_{2} on the surface of Callisto is about 10 nPa (10 pbar).) Other gases, like nitrogen or methane, are unlikely to be present, because Titania's weak gravity could not prevent them from escaping into space. At the maximum temperature attainable during Titania's summer solstice (89 K), the vapor pressure of carbon dioxide is about 300 μPa (3 nbar).

On September 8, 2001, Titania occulted a bright star (HIP 106829) with a visible magnitude of 7.2; this was an opportunity to both refine Titania's diameter and ephemeris, and to detect any extant atmosphere. The data revealed no atmosphere to a surface pressure of 1–2 mPa (10–20 nbar); if it exists, it would have to be far thinner than that of Triton or Pluto. This upper limit is still several times higher than the maximum possible surface pressure of the carbon dioxide, meaning that the measurements place essentially no constraints on parameters of the atmosphere.

The peculiar geometry of the Uranian system causes the moons' poles to receive more solar energy than their equatorial regions. Because the vapor pressure of CO_{2} is a steep function of temperature, this may lead to the accumulation of carbon dioxide in the low-latitude regions of Titania, where it can stably exist on high albedo patches and shaded regions of the surface in the form of ice. During the summer, when the polar temperatures reach as high as 85–90 K, carbon dioxide sublimates and migrates to the opposite pole and to the equatorial regions, giving rise to a type of carbon cycle. The accumulated carbon dioxide ice can be removed from cold traps by magnetospheric particles, which sputter it from the surface. Titania is thought to have lost a significant amount of carbon dioxide since its formation 4.6 billion years ago.

== Origin and evolution ==
Titania is thought to have formed from an accretion disc or subnebula; a disc of gas and dust that either existed around Uranus for some time after its formation or was created by the giant impact that most likely gave Uranus its large obliquity. The precise composition of the subnebula is not known; however, the relatively high density of Titania and other Uranian moons compared to the moons of Saturn indicates that it may have been relatively water-poor. (Note: For instance, Tethys, a Saturnian moon, has the density of 0.97 g/cm^{3}, which implies it contains more than 90% of water.) Significant amounts of nitrogen and carbon may have been present in the form of carbon monoxide and N_{2} instead of ammonia and methane. The moons that formed in such a subnebula would contain less water ice (with CO and N_{2} trapped as a clathrate) and more rock, explaining their higher density.

Titania's accretion probably lasted for several thousand years. The impacts that accompanied accretion caused heating of the moon's outer layer. The maximum temperature of around 250 K (−23 °C) was reached at a depth of about 60 kilometres (37 mi). After the end of formation, the subsurface layer cooled, while the interior of Titania heated due to decay of radioactive elements present in its rocks. The cooling near-surface layer contracted, while the interior expanded. This caused strong extensional stresses in the moon's crust leading to cracking. Some of the present-day canyons may be a result of this. The process lasted for about 200 million years, implying that any endogenous activity ceased billions of years ago.

The initial accretional heating together with continued decay of radioactive elements were probably strong enough to melt the ice if some antifreeze like ammonia (in the form of ammonia hydrate) or salt was present. Further melting may have led to the separation of ice from rocks and formation of a rocky core surrounded by an icy mantle. A layer of liquid water (ocean) rich in dissolved ammonia may have formed at the core–mantle boundary. The eutectic temperature of this mixture is 176 K (−97 °C). If the temperature dropped below this value, the ocean would have subsequently frozen. The freezing of the water would have caused the interior to expand, which may have been responsible for the formation of the majority of the canyons. However, the present knowledge of Titania's geological evolution is quite limited. Whereas more up to date analysis suggest that larger moons of Uranus are not only capable of having active subsurface oceans; but in fact; presumed to have subterranean oceans beneath them.

== Exploration ==
So far, the only close-up images of Titania have been from the Voyager 2 probe, which photographed the moon during its flyby of Uranus in January 1986. Since the closest distance between Voyager 2 and Titania was only 365,200 km (226,900 mi), the best images of this moon have a spatial resolution of about 3.4 km (only Miranda and Ariel were imaged with a better resolution). The images cover about 40% of the surface, but only 24% was photographed with the precision required for geological mapping. At the time of the flyby, the southern hemisphere of Titania (like those of the other moons) was pointed towards the Sun, so the northern (dark) hemisphere could not be studied.

No other spacecraft has ever visited the Uranian system or Titania. One possibility, now discarded, was to send Cassini on from Saturn to Uranus in an extended mission. Another mission concept proposed was the Uranus orbiter and probe concept, evaluated around 2010. Uranus was also examined as part of one trajectory for a precursor interstellar probe concept, Innovative Interstellar Explorer.

The Uranus Orbiter and Probe mission architecture was identified as the highest priority for a NASA Flagship mission by the 2023–2032 Planetary Science Decadal Survey. The science questions motivating this prioritization include questions about the Uranian satellites' bulk properties, internal structure, and geologic history. A Uranus orbiter had previously been listed as the third priority for a NASA Flagship mission by the 2013–2022 Planetary Science Decadal Survey.

According to a 2026 report by Amy Simon et al., because Titania is Uranus' largest and most massive moon, they recommend that the Uranus Orbiter use multiple flybys of Titania to slow itself while entering orbit around Uranus, as it is the most effective moon for reducing the spacecraft's velocity.

== See also ==
- Titania in fiction
- List of natural satellites
