= Rousillon Rupes =

Cliff on Titania

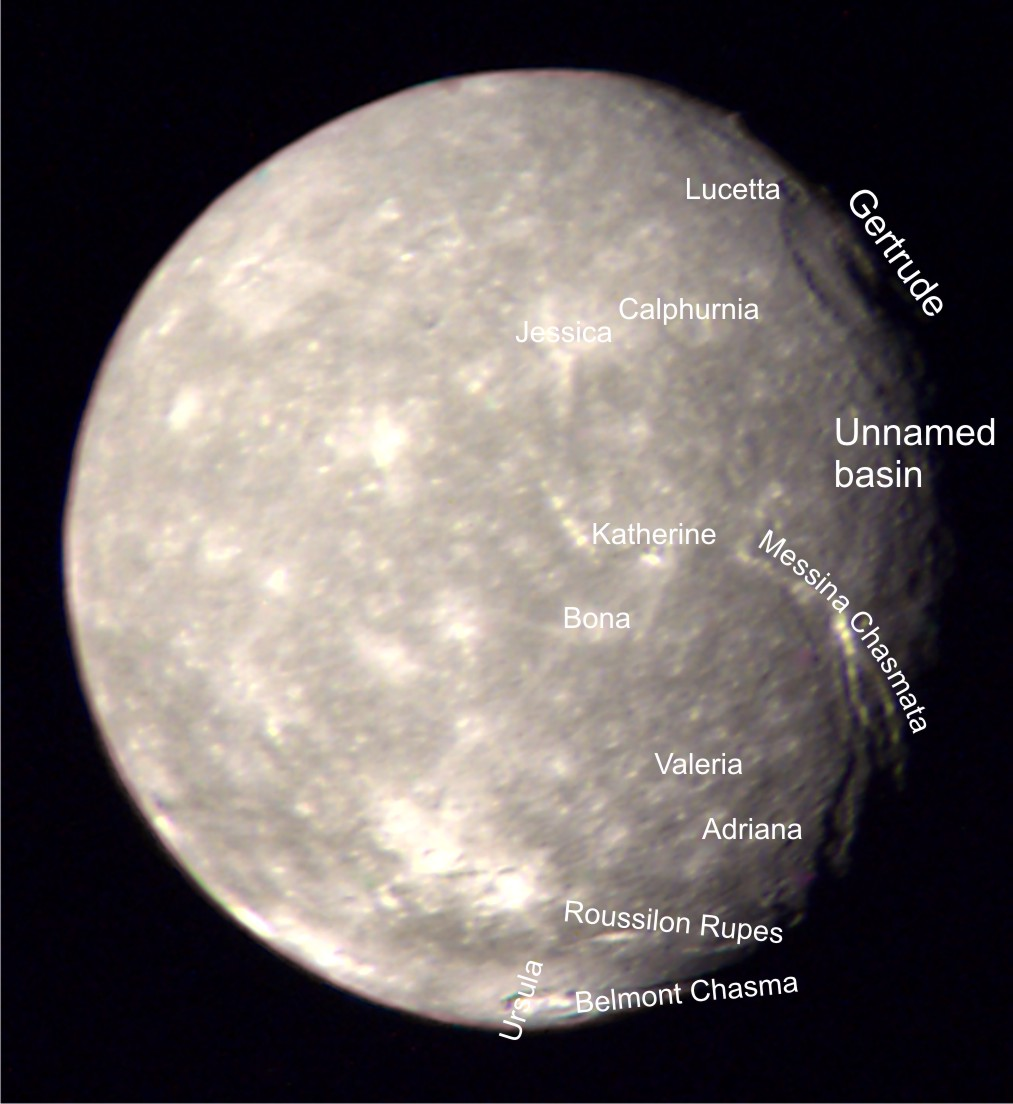
Rousillon Rupes are at the bottom just above Ursula crater.

Rousillon Rupes is a scarp (rupes is Latin for "cliff") on the surface of the Uranian moon Titania named after "Bertram, count of Rousillon" (an English misspelling for Roussillon) in William Shakespeare's comedy All's Well That Ends Well. The 402 km long feature is a normal fault situated near the equator and running perpendicular to it. The scarp cuts impact craters, which probably means that it was formed at a relatively late stage of moon's evolution, when the interior of Titania expanded and its ice crust cracked as a result. Rousillon Rupes has only a few craters superimposed on it, which also implies its relatively young age. The scarp was first imaged by Voyager 2 spacecraft in January 1986.
