= Messina Chasmata =

Chasm system on Titania

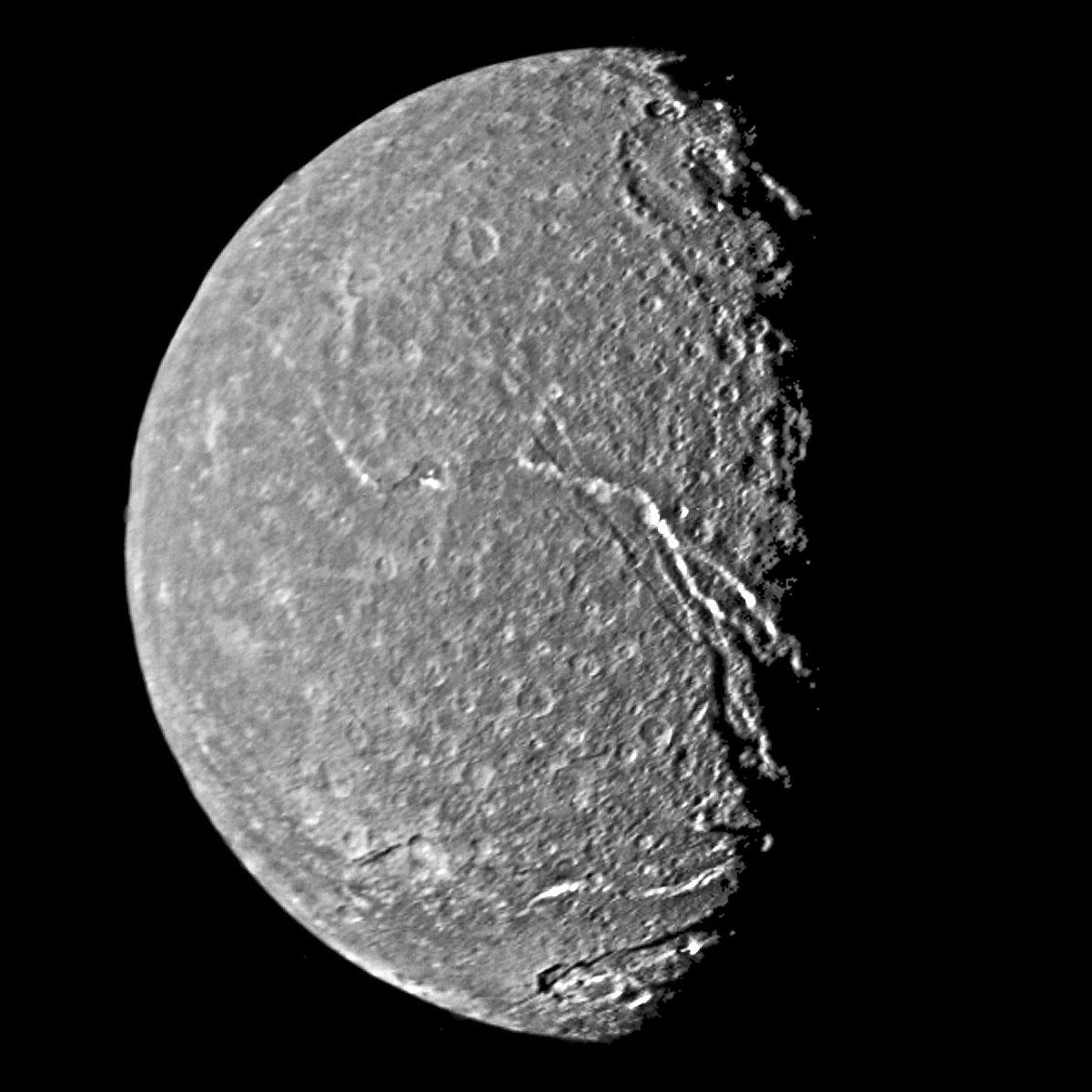
- Messina Chasmata is near the center of this Voyager 2 image of Titania
- Feature type: Chasm system
- Location: Titania
- Coordinates: 33.30°S 25.00°W
- Length: ~1,492 km (927 mi) (Note: Length is labelled under "diameter" in the GPN database.)
- Discoverer: Voyager 2
- Naming: Official

The Messina Chasmata /mɛˈsiːnə ˈkæzmətə/ is the largest canyon or system of canyons on the surface of the Uranian moon Titania, named after a location in William Shakespeare's comedy Much Ado About Nothing. The 1,492 km (927 mi) long feature includes two normal faults running NW–SE, which bound a down-dropped crustal block forming a structure called a graben. The graben cuts impact craters, which probably means that it was formed at a relatively late stage of the moon's evolution, when the interior of Titania expanded and its ice crust cracked as a result. The Messina Chasmata has only a few superimposed craters, which also implies being relatively young. The feature was first imaged by Voyager 2 in January 1986.
