= Prohibition City, Missouri =

Unincorporated community in Missouri, U.S.

Coordinates: 40°25′23″N 94°24′18″W

Prohibition City is an unincorporated community in Worth County, in the U.S. state of Missouri. In 1943 the Smithton School was adjacent to Missouri Route YY (at the time U. S. Route 169) approximately 1.5 miles northeast of Worth.

== History ==
An early variant name was "Smithton". A settlement called Smithton served as county seat, but the town's population dwindled after the seat was removed to Grant City. A post office called Smithton was established in 1861, and closed in 1870; the post office reopened as Prohibition City in 1877, and was discontinued in 1881. A first settler's advocacy of prohibition politics caused the most recent name to be selected.
