= Irena, Missouri =

Village in Worth County, Missouri, United States

- Village
- Location of Irena, Missouri
- Coordinates: 40°32′25″N 94°23′24″W
- Country: United States
- State: Missouri
- County: Worth
- Township: Fletchall

Area
  - Total: 0.88 sq mi (2.28 km^{2})
  - Land: 0.88 sq mi (2.28 km^{2})
  - Water: 0 sq mi (0.00 km^{2})
- Elevation: 1,132 ft (345 m)

Population (2020)
  - Total: 14
  - Density: 15.9/sq mi (6.13/km^{2})
- Time zone: UTC-6 (Central (CST))
  - Summer (DST): UTC-5 (CDT)
- FIPS code: 29-35324
- GNIS feature ID: 2398273

Irena is a village in north central Worth County, Missouri, United States. The population was 14 at the 2020 census.

== History ==
Irena was laid out in 1876, and named after Irena, England, the ancestral home of the wife of a first settler. A post office called Irena was established in 1883, and remained in operation until 1932.

The village of Irena was re-established in 1999 and is currently a private, low-density community.

== Geography ==
Irena is located just east of US Route 169 on County Road 223. The Missouri-Iowa border is 1.4 miles to the north and Grant City is four miles to the south along Route 169. The headwaters of Jay Creek arise just to the west of the community.

According to the United States Census Bureau, the village has a total area of 0.88 square miles (2.28 km^{2}), all land.

== Demographics ==
Historical population
Census	Pop.	Note	%±
2000	33		—
2010	18		−45.5%
2020	14		−22.2%
U.S. Decennial Census

=== 2010 census ===
As of the census of 2010, there were 18 people, 7 households, and 5 families residing in the village. The population density was 20.5 inhabitants per square mile (7.9/km^{2}). There were 8 housing units at an average density of 9.1 units per square mile (3.5 units/km^{2}). The racial makeup of the village was 100.0% White.

There were 7 households, of which 42.9% had children under the age of 18 living with them, 57.1% were married couples living together, 14.3% had a female householder with no husband present, and 28.6% were non-families. 14.3% of all households were made up of individuals. The average household size was 2.57 and the average family size was 3.00.

The median age in the village was 48 years. 22.2% of residents were under the age of 18; 11.3% were between the ages of 18 and 24; 11.2% were from 25 to 44; 33.3% were from 45 to 64; and 22.2% were 65 years of age or older. The gender makeup of the village was 44.4% male and 55.6% female.

=== 2000 census ===
As of the census of 2000, there were 33 people, 9 households, and 9 families residing in the village. The population density was 32.8 inhabitants per square mile (12.7/km^{2}). There were 9 housing units at an average density of 8.9 units per square mile (3.4 units/km^{2}). The racial makeup of the village was 100.00% White.

There were 9 households, out of which 55.6% had children under the age of 18 living with them, 100.0% were married couples living together, and 0.0% were non-families. No households were made up of individuals, and none had someone living alone who was 65 years of age or older. The average household size was 3.67 and the average family size was 3.44.

In the village, the population was spread out, with 45.5% under the age of 18, 24.2% from 25 to 44, 24.2% from 45 to 64, and 6.1% who were 65 years of age or older. The median age was 30 years. For every 100 females, there were 106.3 males. For every 100 females age 18 and over, there were 100.0 males.

The median income for a household in the village was $31,875, and the median income for a family was $31,875. Males had a median income of $26,250 versus $28,750 for females. The per capita income for the village was $12,605. None of the population and none of the families were below the poverty line.

== See also ==
- List of municipalities in Missouri
