= Smith Township, Worth County, Missouri =

Township in Worth County, Missouri, U.S.

Smith Township
- Township
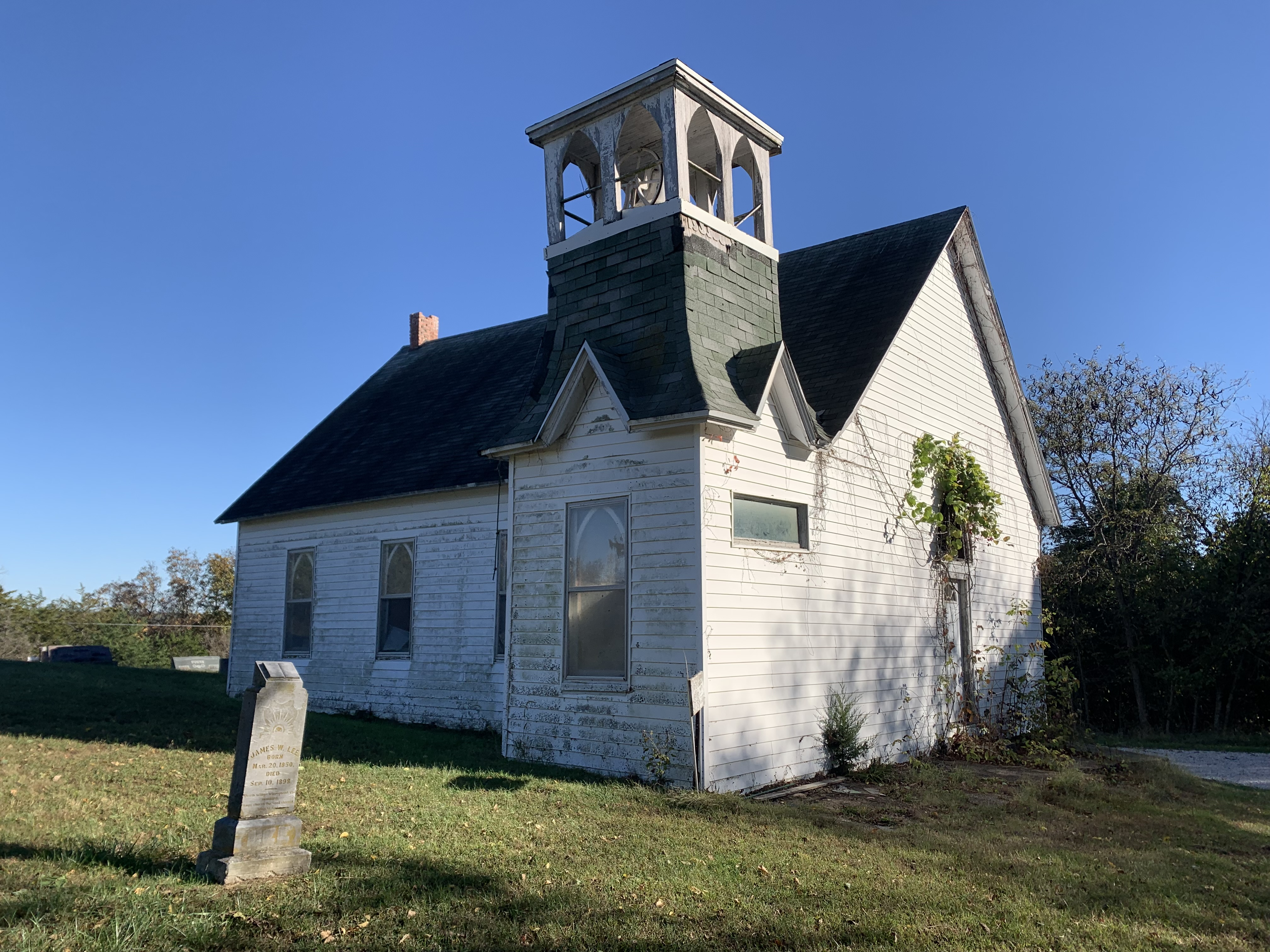
- Lotts Grove Church and Cemetery in Smith Township

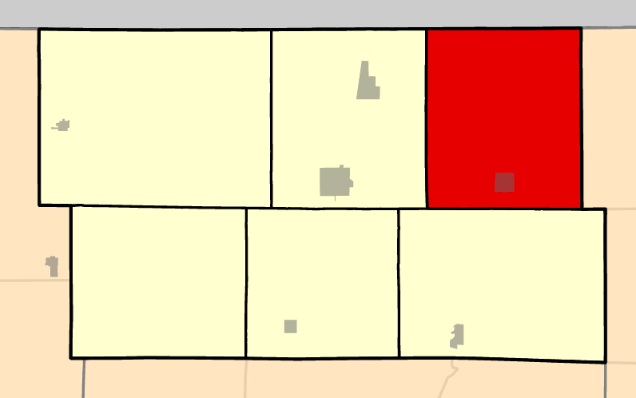
- Coordinates: 40°30′39″N 94°17′59″W
- Country: United States
- State: Missouri
- County: Worth

Area
  - Total: 41.99 sq mi (108.8 km^{2})
  - Land: 41.93 sq mi (108.6 km^{2})
  - Water: 0.06 sq mi (0.16 km^{2}) 0.14%
- Elevation: 1,027 ft (313 m)

Population (2020)
  - Total: 139
  - Density: 3.3/sq mi (1.3/km^{2})
- FIPS code: 29-22768348
- GNIS feature ID: 767543

Smith Township is a township in Worth County, Missouri, United States. At the 2020 census, its population was 139. The town of Allendale lies in its south and the East Fork Grand River traverses from its northeast to southwest. It contains 42 sections.

Smith Township has the name of Freeman O. Smith, a pioneer citizen. A post office named Hudson existed in the extreme northeast of this township.

== Transportation ==
The following highways travel through the township:

- Route 46
- Route C
- Route HH
- Route O
- Route PP
- Route T
- Route Y

== Gallery ==
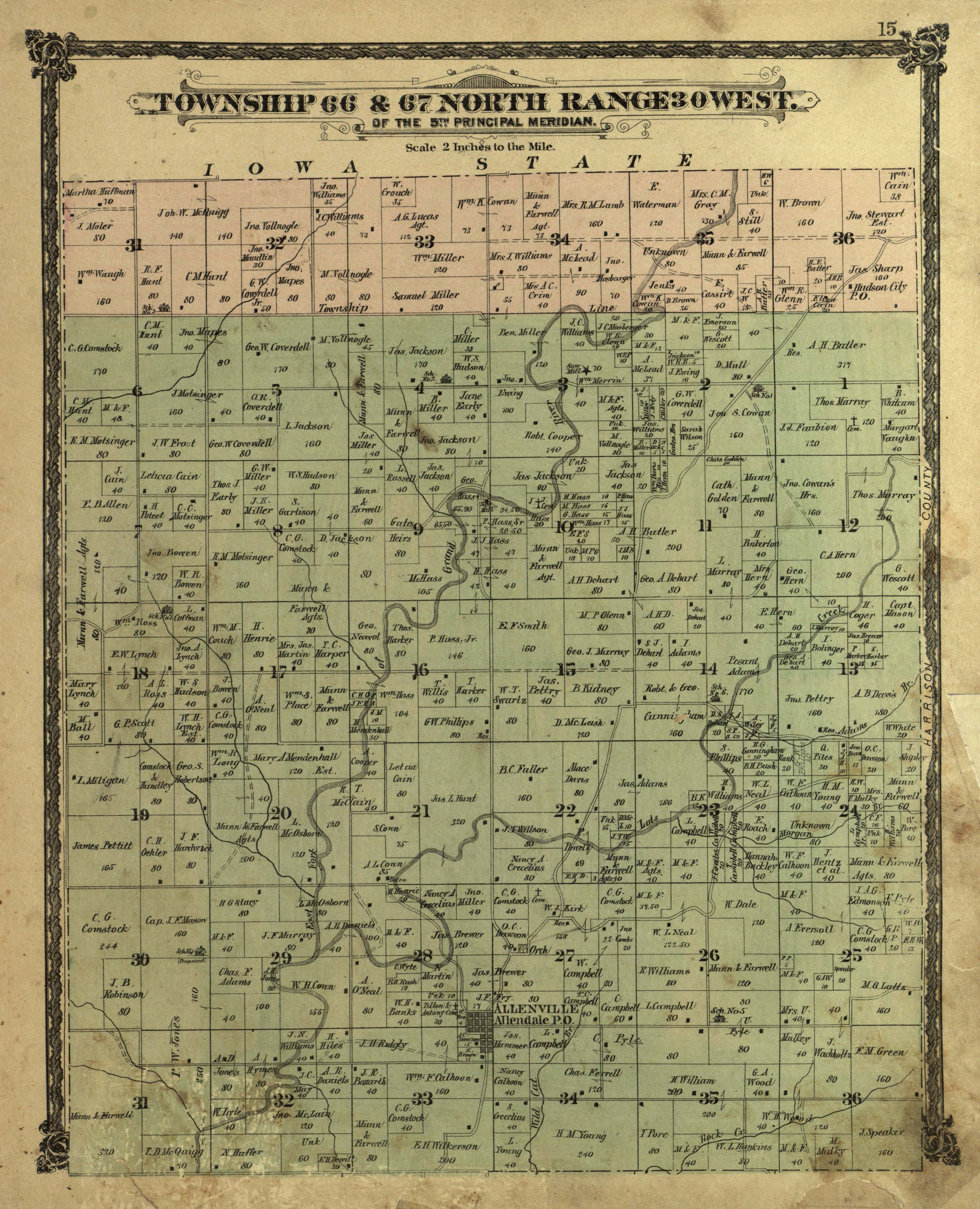
Township 66 and 67 North; Range 30 West of the 5th Principal Meridian
