= 1920 United States presidential election in Missouri =

- November 2, 1920
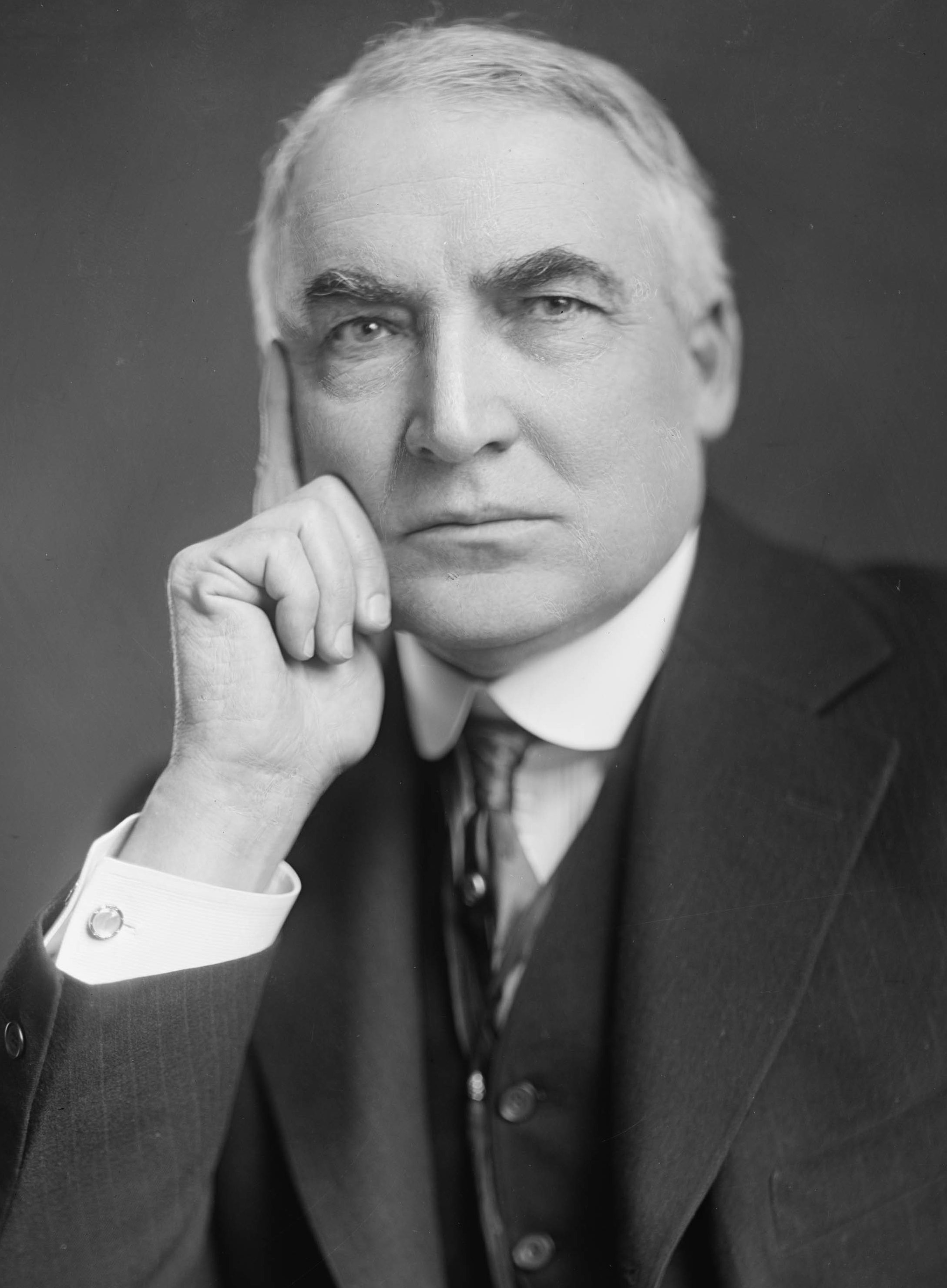

Nominee	Warren G. Harding	James M. Cox
Party	Republican	Democratic
Home state	Ohio	Ohio
Running mate	Calvin Coolidge	Franklin D. Roosevelt
Electoral vote	18	0
Popular vote	727,162	574,799
Percentage	54.56%	43.13%
County results
Harding
40–50%
50–60%
60–70%
70–80%
80–90%
90–100%
Cox
40–50%
50–60%
60–70%
70–80%
80–90%
President before election
Woodrow Wilson
Democratic
Elected President
Warren G. Harding
Republican

The 1920 United States presidential election in Missouri took place on November 2, 1920, as part of the 1920 United States presidential election. Voters chose 18 representatives, or electors, to the Electoral College, who voted for president and vice president.

The Republican candidate, Warren G. Harding, won the state of Missouri and collected its 18 electoral votes. This election marked the first time since 1868 that a Republican carried Missouri with a majority of the vote.

== Results ==
1920 United States presidential election in Missouri
Party	Candidate	Votes	%
Republican	Warren G. Harding	727,162	54.56%
Democratic	James M. Cox	574,799	43.13%
Socialist	Eugene Debs	20,242	1.52%
Prohibition	Aaron S. Watkins	5,142	0.39%
Farmer–Labor	Parley P. Christensen	3,291	0.25%
Socialist Labor	William Cox	2,164	0.16%
Total votes		1,332,800	100%

=== Results by county ===
1920 United States presidential election in Missouri by county
County	Warren G. Harding Republican		James M. Cox Democratic		Eugene V. Debs Socialist		Aaron S. Watkins Prohibition		Parley P. Christensen Farmer–Labor		Verne L. Reynolds Socialist Labor		Margin		Total votes cast
County	#	%	#	%	#	%	#	%	#	%	#	%	#	%	Total votes cast
Adair	4,861	61.70%	2,534	32.17%	389	4.94%	54	0.69%	8	0.10%	32	0.41%	2,327	29.54%	7,878
Andrew	3,913	60.86%	2,466	38.36%	3	0.05%	36	0.56%	5	0.08%	6	0.09%	1,447	22.51%	6,429
Atchison	3,236	58.69%	2,227	40.39%	20	0.36%	25	0.45%	6	0.11%	0	0.00%	1,009	18.30%	5,514
Audrain	3,827	40.67%	5,514	58.60%	28	0.30%	29	0.31%	7	0.07%	4	0.04%	-1,687	-17.93%	9,409
Barry	5,162	57.04%	3,729	41.21%	122	1.35%	24	0.27%	11	0.12%	1	0.01%	1,433	15.84%	9,049
Barton	3,480	51.07%	3,040	44.61%	214	3.14%	56	0.82%	8	0.12%	16	0.23%	440	6.46%	6,814
Bates	5,039	51.91%	4,433	45.66%	119	1.23%	82	0.84%	21	0.22%	14	0.14%	606	6.24%	9,708
Benton	3,367	68.50%	1,506	30.64%	15	0.31%	25	0.51%	0	0.00%	2	0.04%	1,861	37.86%	4,915
Bollinger	2,869	57.97%	2,019	40.80%	41	0.83%	14	0.28%	4	0.08%	2	0.04%	850	17.18%	4,949
Boone	4,077	31.63%	8,748	67.87%	28	0.22%	16	0.12%	14	0.11%	7	0.05%	-4,671	-36.24%	12,890
Buchanan	17,191	50.99%	16,188	48.02%	201	0.60%	75	0.22%	39	0.12%	20	0.06%	1,003	2.98%	33,714
Butler	4,601	61.82%	2,662	35.77%	133	1.79%	28	0.38%	7	0.09%	11	0.15%	1,939	26.05%	7,442
Caldwell	4,168	62.32%	2,498	37.35%	0	0.00%	22	0.33%	0	0.00%	0	0.00%	1,670	24.97%	6,688
Callaway	3,274	35.06%	6,035	64.62%	11	0.12%	17	0.18%	2	0.02%	0	0.00%	-2,761	-29.56%	9,339
Camden	2,276	67.96%	1,034	30.87%	25	0.75%	9	0.27%	2	0.06%	3	0.09%	1,242	37.09%	3,349
Cape Girardeau	7,537	61.41%	4,584	37.35%	68	0.55%	62	0.51%	18	0.15%	4	0.03%	2,953	24.06%	12,273
Carroll	5,609	57.35%	4,075	41.67%	28	0.29%	60	0.61%	7	0.07%	1	0.01%	1,534	15.69%	9,780
Carter	1,057	51.64%	930	45.43%	53	2.59%	1	0.05%	2	0.10%	4	0.20%	127	6.20%	2,047
Cass	4,055	44.15%	5,030	54.76%	21	0.23%	61	0.66%	12	0.13%	6	0.07%	-975	-10.62%	9,185
Cedar	3,488	63.48%	1,936	35.23%	60	1.09%	9	0.16%	2	0.04%	0	0.00%	1,552	28.24%	5,495
Chariton	4,331	47.68%	4,675	51.46%	17	0.19%	51	0.56%	8	0.09%	2	0.02%	-344	-3.79%	9,084
Christian	3,795	78.13%	919	18.92%	100	2.06%	35	0.72%	6	0.12%	2	0.04%	2,876	59.21%	4,857
Clark	3,310	57.46%	2,383	41.36%	27	0.47%	30	0.52%	7	0.12%	4	0.07%	927	16.09%	5,761
Clay	2,804	30.75%	6,283	68.91%	18	0.20%	8	0.09%	4	0.04%	1	0.01%	-3,479	-38.16%	9,118
Clinton	3,165	48.59%	3,304	50.72%	11	0.17%	31	0.48%	3	0.05%	0	0.00%	-139	-2.13%	6,514
Cole	5,878	58.31%	4,167	41.34%	31	0.31%	4	0.04%	0	0.00%	1	0.01%	1,711	16.97%	10,081
Cooper	5,151	58.16%	3,657	41.29%	15	0.17%	27	0.30%	5	0.06%	1	0.01%	1,494	16.87%	8,856
Crawford	2,634	60.44%	1,658	38.04%	39	0.89%	14	0.32%	9	0.21%	4	0.09%	976	22.40%	4,358
Dade	3,520	63.92%	1,892	34.36%	44	0.80%	44	0.80%	5	0.09%	2	0.04%	1,628	29.56%	5,507
Dallas	2,665	69.93%	1,100	28.86%	25	0.66%	19	0.50%	0	0.00%	2	0.05%	1,565	41.07%	3,811
Daviess	4,458	54.92%	3,560	43.85%	45	0.55%	44	0.54%	4	0.05%	7	0.09%	898	11.06%	8,118
DeKalb	3,001	57.83%	2,121	40.87%	7	0.13%	53	1.02%	4	0.08%	3	0.06%	880	16.96%	5,189
Dent	2,204	51.69%	1,970	46.20%	58	1.36%	7	0.16%	17	0.40%	8	0.19%	234	5.49%	4,264
Douglas	3,327	82.09%	577	14.24%	123	3.03%	19	0.47%	4	0.10%	3	0.07%	2,750	67.85%	4,053
Dunklin	4,455	44.72%	5,199	52.18%	289	2.90%	14	0.14%	3	0.03%	3	0.03%	-744	-7.47%	9,963
Franklin	8,712	74.25%	2,814	23.98%	133	1.13%	43	0.37%	21	0.18%	10	0.09%	5,898	50.27%	11,733
Gasconade	4,481	90.02%	454	9.12%	15	0.30%	16	0.32%	9	0.18%	3	0.06%	4,027	80.90%	4,978
Gentry	3,442	49.68%	3,374	48.69%	19	0.27%	89	1.28%	3	0.04%	2	0.03%	68	0.98%	6,929
Greene	15,755	56.02%	11,514	40.94%	645	2.29%	164	0.58%	30	0.11%	18	0.06%	4,241	15.08%	28,126
Grundy	5,123	64.25%	2,721	34.13%	41	0.51%	75	0.94%	9	0.11%	4	0.05%	2,402	30.13%	7,973
Harrison	5,151	66.55%	2,502	32.33%	11	0.14%	70	0.90%	5	0.06%	1	0.01%	2,649	34.22%	7,740
Henry	5,313	49.14%	5,367	49.63%	53	0.49%	59	0.55%	16	0.15%	5	0.05%	-54	-0.50%	10,813
Hickory	2,131	78.55%	532	19.61%	35	1.29%	13	0.48%	2	0.07%	0	0.00%	1,599	58.94%	2,713
Holt	4,153	63.35%	2,329	35.52%	23	0.35%	35	0.53%	14	0.21%	2	0.03%	1,824	27.82%	6,556
Howard	2,125	30.85%	4,735	68.74%	9	0.13%	14	0.20%	5	0.07%	0	0.00%	-2,610	-37.89%	6,888
Howell	4,344	63.24%	2,323	33.82%	150	2.18%	29	0.42%	18	0.26%	5	0.07%	2,021	29.42%	6,869
Iron	1,463	47.64%	1,554	50.60%	23	0.75%	27	0.88%	3	0.10%	1	0.03%	-91	-2.96%	3,071
Jackson	79,875	50.49%	76,791	48.54%	628	0.40%	453	0.29%	361	0.23%	106	0.07%	3,084	1.95%	158,214
Jasper	17,074	58.42%	11,006	37.66%	793	2.71%	240	0.82%	37	0.13%	75	0.26%	6,068	20.76%	29,225
Jefferson	5,730	54.08%	4,684	44.21%	119	1.12%	40	0.38%	20	0.19%	2	0.02%	1,046	9.87%	10,595
Johnson	5,700	50.66%	5,444	48.38%	36	0.32%	58	0.52%	10	0.09%	4	0.04%	256	2.28%	11,252
Knox	2,749	54.32%	2,250	44.46%	34	0.67%	23	0.45%	2	0.04%	3	0.06%	499	9.86%	5,061
Laclede	3,469	60.29%	2,183	37.94%	67	1.16%	27	0.47%	4	0.07%	4	0.07%	1,286	22.35%	5,754
Lafayette	7,471	54.40%	6,169	44.92%	60	0.44%	13	0.09%	12	0.09%	9	0.07%	1,302	9.48%	13,734
Lawrence	6,093	61.33%	3,532	35.55%	216	2.17%	80	0.81%	9	0.09%	5	0.05%	2,561	25.78%	9,935
Lewis	2,810	43.87%	3,542	55.30%	22	0.34%	15	0.23%	15	0.23%	1	0.02%	-732	-11.43%	6,405
Lincoln	3,209	46.45%	3,660	52.97%	11	0.16%	22	0.32%	4	0.06%	3	0.04%	-451	-6.53%	6,909
Linn	5,557	51.08%	5,184	47.66%	62	0.57%	66	0.61%	0	0.00%	9	0.08%	373	3.43%	10,878
Livingston	5,093	57.51%	3,666	41.40%	14	0.16%	74	0.84%	6	0.07%	3	0.03%	1,427	16.11%	8,856
Macon	6,309	51.75%	5,626	46.15%	187	1.53%	43	0.35%	16	0.13%	11	0.09%	683	5.60%	12,192
Madison	2,023	52.19%	1,830	47.21%	15	0.39%	7	0.18%	0	0.00%	1	0.03%	193	4.98%	3,876
Maries	1,445	45.87%	1,677	53.24%	23	0.73%	4	0.13%	1	0.03%	0	0.00%	-232	-7.37%	3,150
Marion	4,660	40.36%	6,719	58.20%	61	0.53%	81	0.70%	16	0.14%	8	0.07%	-2,059	-17.83%	11,545
McDonald	2,921	55.21%	2,242	42.37%	100	1.89%	15	0.28%	6	0.11%	7	0.13%	679	12.83%	5,291
Mercer	3,170	74.17%	1,044	24.43%	18	0.42%	40	0.94%	1	0.02%	1	0.02%	2,126	49.74%	4,274
Miller	3,555	64.94%	1,833	33.49%	63	1.15%	17	0.31%	4	0.07%	2	0.04%	1,722	31.46%	5,474
Mississippi	2,193	46.87%	2,442	52.19%	38	0.81%	5	0.11%	1	0.02%	0	0.00%	-249	-5.32%	4,679
Moniteau	3,535	58.98%	2,405	40.12%	17	0.28%	26	0.43%	9	0.15%	2	0.03%	1,130	18.85%	5,994
Monroe	1,406	18.42%	6,136	80.37%	25	0.33%	24	0.31%	40	0.52%	4	0.05%	-4,730	-61.95%	7,635
Montgomery	3,910	55.16%	3,103	43.78%	13	0.18%	59	0.83%	2	0.03%	1	0.01%	807	11.39%	7,088
Morgan	2,911	60.90%	1,834	38.37%	9	0.19%	19	0.40%	6	0.13%	1	0.02%	1,077	22.53%	4,780
New Madrid	3,745	49.95%	3,637	48.51%	96	1.28%	3	0.04%	6	0.08%	11	0.15%	108	1.44%	7,498
Newton	5,541	55.90%	4,078	41.14%	229	2.31%	55	0.55%	1	0.01%	8	0.08%	1,463	14.76%	9,912
Nodaway	6,971	55.80%	5,404	43.26%	22	0.18%	83	0.66%	10	0.08%	3	0.02%	1,567	12.54%	12,493
Oregon	1,319	39.57%	1,961	58.84%	53	1.59%	0	0.00%	0	0.00%	0	0.00%	-642	-19.26%	3,333
Osage	3,699	76.17%	1,118	23.02%	27	0.56%	7	0.14%	4	0.08%	1	0.02%	2,581	53.15%	4,856
Ozark	2,457	79.72%	569	18.46%	46	1.49%	8	0.26%	0	0.00%	2	0.06%	1,888	61.26%	3,082
Pemiscot	4,443	52.56%	3,901	46.15%	108	1.28%	1	0.01%	0	0.00%	0	0.00%	542	6.41%	8,453
Perry	3,652	70.49%	1,504	29.03%	6	0.12%	14	0.27%	4	0.08%	1	0.02%	2,148	41.46%	5,181
Pettis	8,595	55.98%	6,561	42.73%	123	0.80%	59	0.38%	13	0.08%	4	0.03%	2,034	13.25%	15,355
Phelps	2,692	52.25%	2,422	47.01%	23	0.45%	9	0.17%	4	0.08%	2	0.04%	270	5.24%	5,152
Pike	3,860	43.07%	5,034	56.16%	33	0.37%	35	0.39%	1	0.01%	0	0.00%	-1,174	-13.10%	8,963
Platte	1,724	28.25%	4,361	71.47%	0	0.00%	10	0.16%	7	0.11%	0	0.00%	-2,637	-43.22%	6,102
Polk	4,967	62.82%	2,847	36.01%	37	0.47%	45	0.57%	7	0.09%	4	0.05%	2,120	26.81%	7,907
Pulaski	1,853	47.88%	1,978	51.11%	21	0.54%	12	0.31%	6	0.16%	0	0.00%	-125	-3.23%	3,870
Putnam	3,880	72.92%	1,315	24.71%	71	1.33%	43	0.81%	6	0.11%	6	0.11%	2,565	48.21%	5,321
Ralls	1,362	32.45%	2,803	66.79%	16	0.38%	12	0.29%	4	0.10%	0	0.00%	-1,441	-34.33%	4,197
Randolph	3,768	31.48%	8,115	67.81%	33	0.28%	46	0.38%	4	0.03%	2	0.02%	-4,347	-36.32%	11,968
Ray	3,228	39.53%	4,865	59.58%	27	0.33%	35	0.43%	6	0.07%	4	0.05%	-1,637	-20.05%	8,165
Reynolds	1,173	38.51%	1,837	60.31%	27	0.89%	5	0.16%	1	0.03%	3	0.10%	-664	-21.80%	3,046
Ripley	1,752	47.66%	1,735	47.20%	179	4.87%	7	0.19%	3	0.08%	0	0.00%	17	0.46%	3,676
Saint Charles	6,645	72.13%	2,472	26.83%	49	0.53%	21	0.23%	15	0.16%	11	0.12%	4,173	45.29%	9,213
Saint Clair	3,249	56.94%	2,296	40.24%	101	1.77%	38	0.67%	3	0.05%	19	0.33%	953	16.70%	5,706
Saint Francois	5,504	49.86%	5,300	48.01%	184	1.67%	45	0.41%	3	0.03%	3	0.03%	204	1.85%	11,039
Saint Louis County	25,008	63.57%	12,438	31.62%	1,396	3.55%	143	0.36%	225	0.57%	132	0.34%	12,570	31.95%	39,342
Saint Louis City	163,280	57.77%	106,047	37.52%	10,083	3.57%	722	0.26%	1,705	0.60%	815	0.29%	57,233	20.25%	282,652
Sainte Genevieve	1,917	62.08%	1,149	37.21%	6	0.19%	10	0.32%	6	0.19%	0	0.00%	768	24.87%	3,088
Saline	5,613	43.81%	7,114	55.53%	14	0.11%	59	0.46%	7	0.05%	5	0.04%	-1,501	-11.72%	12,812
Schuyler	1,806	49.66%	1,793	49.30%	13	0.36%	24	0.66%	0	0.00%	1	0.03%	13	0.36%	3,637
Scotland	2,509	53.11%	2,124	44.96%	57	1.21%	23	0.49%	6	0.13%	5	0.11%	385	8.15%	4,724
Scott	4,204	49.00%	4,157	48.46%	147	1.71%	54	0.63%	10	0.12%	7	0.08%	47	0.55%	8,579
Shannon	1,639	48.62%	1,661	49.27%	59	1.75%	8	0.24%	3	0.09%	1	0.03%	-22	-0.65%	3,371
Shelby	2,128	34.69%	3,935	64.15%	14	0.23%	49	0.80%	7	0.11%	1	0.02%	-1,807	-29.46%	6,134
Stoddard	4,641	49.16%	4,428	46.90%	324	3.43%	25	0.26%	8	0.08%	15	0.16%	213	2.26%	9,441
Stone	2,749	78.54%	672	19.20%	57	1.63%	11	0.31%	6	0.17%	5	0.14%	2,077	59.34%	3,500
Sullivan	4,576	56.35%	3,475	42.79%	26	0.32%	37	0.46%	5	0.06%	2	0.02%	1,101	13.56%	8,121
Taney	2,001	67.69%	913	30.89%	22	0.74%	15	0.51%	4	0.14%	1	0.03%	1,088	36.81%	2,956
Texas	3,552	53.94%	2,965	45.03%	43	0.65%	17	0.26%	4	0.06%	4	0.06%	587	8.91%	6,585
Vernon	4,645	45.33%	5,419	52.89%	113	1.10%	45	0.44%	16	0.16%	8	0.08%	-774	-7.55%	10,246
Warren	3,512	84.97%	545	13.19%	54	1.31%	14	0.34%	6	0.15%	2	0.05%	2,967	71.79%	4,133
Washington	2,618	58.36%	1,837	40.95%	23	0.51%	6	0.13%	1	0.02%	1	0.02%	781	17.41%	4,486
Wayne	2,380	52.28%	2,072	45.52%	71	1.56%	25	0.55%	2	0.04%	2	0.04%	308	6.77%	4,552
Webster	4,000	61.45%	2,428	37.30%	40	0.61%	35	0.54%	6	0.09%	0	0.00%	1,572	24.15%	6,509
Worth	1,888	54.72%	1,532	44.41%	4	0.12%	26	0.75%	0	0.00%	0	0.00%	356	10.32%	3,450
Wright	3,661	63.69%	2,008	34.93%	49	0.85%	21	0.37%	2	0.03%	7	0.12%	1,653	28.76%	5,748
Totals	727,162	54.56%	574,799	43.13%	20,242	1.52%	5,142	0.39%	3,291	0.25%	2,164	0.16%	152,363	11.43%	1,332,800

== See also ==
- United States presidential elections in Missouri
