= 1968 United States presidential election in Missouri =

- November 5, 1968

Nominee	Richard Nixon	Hubert Humphrey	George Wallace
Party	Republican	Democratic	American Independent
Home state	New York (Note: Although he was born in California and he served as a U.S. senator from California, in 1968 Richard Nixon's official state of residence was New York, because he moved there to practice law after his defeat in the 1962 California gubernatorial election. During his first term as president, Nixon re-established his residency in California. Consequently, most reliable reference books list Nixon's home state as New York in the 1968 election and his home state as California in the 1972 (and 1960) election.)	Minnesota	Alabama
Running mate	Spiro Agnew	Edmund Muskie	S. Marvin Griffin
Electoral vote	12	0	0
Popular vote	811,932	791,444	206,126
Percentage	44.87%	43.74%	11.39%
County results
Nixon
40–50%
50–60%
60–70%
70–80%
Humphrey
40–50%
50–60%
60–70%
Wallace
30–40%
President before election
Lyndon B. Johnson
Democratic
Elected President
Richard Nixon
Republican

The 1968 United States presidential election in Missouri took place on November 5, 1968. All 50 states and the District of Columbia were part of the 1968 United States presidential election. Voters chose 12 electors to the Electoral College, which selected the president and vice president.

Former Vice President Richard Nixon, the Republican nominee, narrowly won Missouri with 811,932 votes and 44.87 percent of the vote, with Vice President Hubert Humphrey, the Democratic nominee, taking 791,444 votes and 43.74 percent of the vote, followed by American Party of Missouri candidate George Wallace, who took 206,126 votes and 11.39 percent of the vote. Wallace's strongest support came from the Missouri Bootheel, with its significant rural black population and powerful cultural and geographic ties to Kentucky's Jackson Purchase, the Arkansas Delta and West Tennessee. He carried the state's southeasternmost county, Pemiscot, and ran second ahead of Nixon in two others nearby. As of the 2024 presidential election, this is the last election in which Missouri voted for a different candidate than neighboring Arkansas.

Nixon overcame Humphrey's 85,000-vote margin in St. Louis by dominating the state's interior and holding his deficit to Humphrey in Jackson County, where most of Kansas City is located, to 21,000 votes. Nixon was the first Republican to win Audrain County and Boone County since 1868, while Callaway and Platte counties voted Republican for the first time ever.

== Results ==
Presidential candidate	Running mate	Party	Electoral vote (EV)	Popular vote (PV)	
Richard M. Nixon	Spiro Agnew	Republican	12	811,932	44.87%
Hubert H. Humphrey	Edmund Muskie	Democrat	0	791,444	43.74%
George Wallace	S. Marvin Griffin	American Party of Missouri	0	206,126	11.39%

=== Results by county ===
County	Richard Nixon Republican		Hubert Humphrey Democratic		George Wallace American Independent		Margin		Total votes cast
County	#	%	#	%	#	%	#	%	Total votes cast
Adair	4,624	58.82%	2,645	33.65%	592	7.53%	1,979	25.17%	7,861
Andrew	3,398	58.97%	2,005	34.80%	359	6.23%	1,393	24.17%	5,762
Atchison	2,206	51.36%	1,752	40.79%	337	7.85%	454	10.57%	4,295
Audrain	5,005	46.24%	4,806	44.41%	1,012	9.35%	199	1.83%	10,823
Barry	5,537	57.12%	3,398	35.06%	758	7.82%	2,139	22.06%	9,693
Barton	2,928	55.68%	1,832	34.84%	499	9.49%	1,096	20.84%	5,259
Bates	4,087	49.49%	3,370	40.81%	801	9.70%	717	8.68%	8,258
Benton	2,899	61.13%	1,345	28.36%	498	10.50%	1,554	32.77%	4,742
Bollinger	2,283	50.08%	1,693	37.14%	583	12.79%	590	12.94%	4,559
Boone	11,917	46.36%	11,771	45.80%	2,015	7.84%	146	0.56%	25,703
Buchanan	16,101	46.38%	15,860	45.69%	2,752	7.93%	241	0.69%	34,713
Butler	6,326	46.98%	4,379	32.52%	2,759	20.49%	1,947	14.46%	13,464
Caldwell	2,631	57.81%	1,490	32.74%	430	9.45%	1,141	25.07%	4,551
Callaway	4,277	46.03%	3,738	40.23%	1,276	13.73%	539	5.80%	9,291
Camden	3,500	61.00%	1,605	27.97%	633	11.03%	1,895	33.03%	5,738
Cape Girardeau	10,298	53.34%	6,656	34.48%	2,351	12.18%	3,642	18.86%	19,305
Carroll	3,680	54.13%	2,473	36.38%	645	9.49%	1,207	17.75%	6,798
Carter	861	45.60%	738	39.09%	289	15.31%	123	6.51%	1,888
Cass	5,271	45.14%	4,468	38.26%	1,938	16.60%	803	6.88%	11,677
Cedar	2,940	64.08%	1,218	26.55%	430	9.37%	1,722	37.53%	4,588
Chariton	2,404	45.50%	2,371	44.87%	509	9.63%	33	0.63%	5,284
Christian	4,019	64.43%	1,586	25.42%	633	10.15%	2,433	39.01%	6,238
Clark	2,111	53.55%	1,489	37.77%	342	8.68%	622	15.78%	3,942
Clay	19,643	44.48%	17,547	39.73%	6,972	15.79%	2,096	4.75%	44,162
Clinton	2,659	45.82%	2,525	43.51%	619	10.67%	134	2.31%	5,803
Cole	11,575	60.55%	5,916	30.95%	1,625	8.50%	5,659	29.60%	19,116
Cooper	4,115	55.29%	2,798	37.59%	530	7.12%	1,317	17.70%	7,443
Crawford	3,525	55.78%	2,123	33.60%	671	10.62%	1,402	22.18%	6,319
Dade	2,250	64.34%	917	26.22%	330	9.44%	1,333	38.12%	3,497
Dallas	2,835	62.49%	1,237	27.26%	465	10.25%	1,598	35.23%	4,537
Daviess	2,288	53.23%	1,676	38.99%	334	7.77%	612	14.24%	4,298
DeKalb	2,112	54.87%	1,452	37.72%	285	7.40%	660	17.15%	3,849
Dent	2,369	50.97%	1,810	38.94%	469	10.09%	559	12.03%	4,648
Douglas	2,836	67.11%	978	23.14%	412	9.75%	1,858	43.97%	4,226
Dunklin	4,366	35.40%	5,063	41.06%	2,903	23.54%	-697	-5.66%	12,332
Franklin	9,823	50.77%	7,566	39.10%	1,960	10.13%	2,257	11.67%	19,349
Gasconade	4,400	74.64%	1,131	19.19%	364	6.17%	3,269	55.45%	5,895
Gentry	2,286	48.73%	2,189	46.66%	216	4.60%	97	2.07%	4,691
Greene	32,638	55.27%	19,659	33.29%	6,751	11.43%	12,979	21.98%	59,048
Grundy	3,213	57.29%	1,976	35.24%	419	7.47%	1,237	22.05%	5,608
Harrison	3,092	59.55%	1,688	32.51%	412	7.94%	1,404	27.04%	5,192
Henry	3,824	47.68%	3,514	43.82%	682	8.50%	310	3.86%	8,020
Hickory	1,484	66.55%	537	24.08%	209	9.37%	947	42.47%	2,230
Holt	2,031	56.09%	1,211	33.44%	379	10.47%	820	22.65%	3,621
Howard	1,825	39.12%	2,333	50.01%	507	10.87%	-508	-10.89%	4,665
Howell	5,631	57.24%	2,763	28.08%	1,444	14.68%	2,868	29.16%	9,838
Iron	1,600	41.60%	1,755	45.63%	491	12.77%	-155	-4.03%	3,846
Jackson	91,086	39.22%	112,154	48.30%	28,980	12.48%	-21,068	-9.08%	232,220
Jasper	16,794	54.24%	10,987	35.49%	3,181	10.27%	5,807	18.75%	30,962
Jefferson	11,708	37.70%	13,230	42.60%	6,115	19.69%	-1,522	-4.90%	31,053
Johnson	4,834	51.78%	3,484	37.32%	1,018	10.90%	1,350	14.46%	9,336
Knox	1,562	49.29%	1,257	39.67%	350	11.04%	305	9.62%	3,169
Laclede	4,860	56.06%	2,958	34.12%	852	9.83%	1,902	21.94%	8,670
Lafayette	6,840	53.42%	4,859	37.95%	1,105	8.63%	1,981	15.47%	12,804
Lawrence	6,834	59.73%	3,710	32.42%	898	7.85%	3,124	27.31%	11,442
Lewis	2,038	43.90%	2,067	44.53%	537	11.57%	-29	-0.63%	4,642
Lincoln	3,185	41.78%	3,142	41.21%	1,297	17.01%	43	0.57%	7,624
Linn	3,795	46.05%	3,933	47.72%	513	6.22%	-138	-1.67%	8,241
Livingston	3,827	48.99%	3,467	44.38%	518	6.63%	360	4.61%	7,812
Macon	3,804	47.04%	3,462	42.81%	821	10.15%	342	4.23%	8,087
Madison	2,164	50.33%	1,521	35.37%	615	14.30%	643	14.96%	4,300
Maries	1,438	47.52%	1,185	39.16%	403	13.32%	253	8.36%	3,026
Marion	4,732	41.62%	5,416	47.64%	1,221	10.74%	-684	-6.02%	11,369
McDonald	3,025	51.32%	2,188	37.12%	681	11.55%	837	14.20%	5,894
Mercer	1,406	60.76%	783	33.84%	125	5.40%	623	26.92%	2,314
Miller	4,425	64.88%	1,727	25.32%	668	9.79%	2,698	39.56%	6,820
Mississippi	1,421	26.82%	2,303	43.46%	1,575	29.72%	728 (Note: In this county where Nixon ran third behind both Humphrey and Wallace, margin given is Humphrey vote minus Wallace vote and percentage margin Humphrey percentage minus Wallace percentage.)	-13.74%	5,299
Moniteau	3,210	58.54%	1,687	30.77%	586	10.69%	1,523	27.77%	5,483
Monroe	1,349	29.07%	2,776	59.81%	516	11.12%	-1,427	-30.74%	4,641
Montgomery	2,903	53.59%	1,891	34.91%	623	11.50%	1,012	18.68%	5,417
Morgan	2,906	57.44%	1,649	32.60%	504	9.96%	1,257	24.84%	5,059
New Madrid	2,317	24.40%	4,195	44.18%	2,984	31.42%	1,211	-12.76%	9,496
Newton	7,343	52.87%	5,064	36.46%	1,481	10.66%	2,279	16.41%	13,888
Nodaway	4,736	48.11%	4,494	45.65%	615	6.25%	242	2.46%	9,845
Oregon	1,213	34.03%	1,726	48.43%	625	17.54%	-513	-14.40%	3,564
Osage	3,107	61.63%	1,540	30.55%	394	7.82%	1,567	31.08%	5,041
Ozark	1,967	68.37%	606	21.06%	304	10.57%	1,361	47.31%	2,877
Pemiscot	2,191	28.01%	2,681	34.28%	2,950	37.71%	-269	-3.43%	7,822
Perry	3,858	61.45%	1,958	31.19%	462	7.36%	1,900	30.26%	6,278
Pettis	6,738	46.08%	6,334	43.32%	1,549	10.59%	404	2.76%	14,621
Phelps	5,577	47.33%	4,211	35.74%	1,995	16.93%	1,366	11.59%	11,783
Pike	3,072	43.47%	3,192	45.17%	803	11.36%	-120	-1.70%	7,067
Platte	4,836	42.74%	4,665	41.22%	1,815	16.04%	171	1.52%	11,316
Polk	4,145	59.82%	2,170	31.32%	614	8.86%	1,975	28.50%	6,929
Pulaski	2,555	45.82%	2,303	41.30%	718	12.88%	252	4.52%	5,576
Putnam	1,971	63.75%	952	30.79%	169	5.47%	1,019	32.96%	3,092
Ralls	1,175	33.07%	1,900	53.48%	478	13.45%	-725	-20.41%	3,553
Randolph	3,582	38.58%	4,810	51.80%	893	9.62%	-1,228	-13.22%	9,285
Ray	2,587	35.90%	3,541	49.14%	1,078	14.96%	-954	-13.24%	7,206
Reynolds	898	34.79%	1,245	48.24%	438	16.97%	-347	-13.45%	2,581
Ripley	1,973	48.24%	1,440	35.21%	677	16.55%	533	13.03%	4,090
St. Charles	13,533	45.63%	10,374	34.98%	5,752	19.39%	3,159	10.65%	29,659
St. Clair	2,271	54.36%	1,496	35.81%	411	9.84%	775	18.55%	4,178
St. Francois	7,492	47.60%	6,379	40.53%	1,867	11.86%	1,113	7.07%	15,738
St. Louis	180,355	46.80%	165,786	43.02%	39,234	10.18%	14,569	3.78%	385,375
St. Louis City	58,252	26.37%	143,010	64.74%	19,652	8.90%	-84,758	-38.37%	220,914
Ste. Genevieve	1,937	42.09%	2,225	48.35%	440	9.56%	-288	-6.26%	4,602
Saline	4,698	46.76%	4,646	46.24%	704	7.01%	52	0.52%	10,048
Schuyler	1,291	53.17%	969	39.91%	168	6.92%	322	13.26%	2,428
Scotland	1,554	50.06%	1,340	43.17%	210	6.77%	214	6.89%	3,104
Scott	3,856	36.23%	4,313	40.52%	2,474	23.25%	-457	-4.29%	10,643
Shannon	1,048	38.67%	1,216	44.87%	446	16.46%	-168	-6.20%	2,710
Shelby	1,693	41.33%	2,045	49.93%	358	8.74%	-352	-8.60%	4,096
Stoddard	3,919	44.43%	3,150	35.71%	1,751	19.85%	769	8.72%	8,820
Stone	3,006	67.32%	1,004	22.49%	455	10.19%	2,002	44.83%	4,465
Sullivan	2,332	52.24%	1,907	42.72%	225	5.04%	425	9.52%	4,464
Taney	3,289	66.82%	1,219	24.77%	414	8.41%	2,070	42.05%	4,922
Texas	4,022	49.53%	3,117	38.39%	981	12.08%	905	11.14%	8,120
Vernon	3,590	45.27%	3,557	44.85%	783	9.87%	33	0.42%	7,930
Warren	2,669	62.55%	1,033	24.21%	565	13.24%	1,636	38.34%	4,267
Washington	2,641	46.26%	2,292	40.15%	776	13.59%	349	6.11%	5,709
Wayne	2,156	47.79%	1,714	38.00%	641	14.21%	442	9.79%	4,511
Webster	4,118	56.90%	2,547	35.19%	572	7.90%	1,571	21.71%	7,237
Worth	924	48.55%	853	44.82%	126	6.62%	71	3.73%	1,903
Wright	3,576	66.22%	1,337	24.76%	487	9.02%	2,239	41.46%	5,400
Totals	811,932	44.87%	791,444	43.74%	206,126	11.39%	20,488	1.13%	1,809,502

==== Counties that flipped from Democratic to Republican ====
- Adair
- Atchison
- Andrew
- Audrain
- Barry
- Barton
- Bates
- Bollinger
- Boone
- Buchanan
- Butler
- Caldwell
- Callaway
- Cape Girardeau
- Carroll
- Carter
- Cass
- Chariton
- Clark
- Clay
- Clinton
- Cooper
- Crawford
- Daviess
- DeKalb
- Dent
- Franklin
- Greene
- Gentry
- Henry
- Harrison
- Holt
- Howell
- Jasper
- Johnson
- Knox
- Laclede
- Lafayette
- Lawrence
- Lincoln
- Linn
- Livingston
- Macon
- Madison
- Maries
- McDonald
- Mercer
- Montgomery
- Oregon
- Newton
- Nodaway
- Pettis
- Phelps
- Perry
- Platte
- Polk
- Pulaski
- Ripley
- St. Clair
- St. Francois
- St. Louis
- Schuyler
- Scotland
- Saline
- Stoddard
- Sullivan
- Texas
- Vernon
- Washington
- Webster
- Wayne
- Worth

==== Counties that flipped from Democratic to American Independent ====
- Pemiscot

== See also ==
- United States presidential elections in Missouri
