= Allendale, Missouri =

Town in Worth County, Missouri, United States

Allendale
- Town
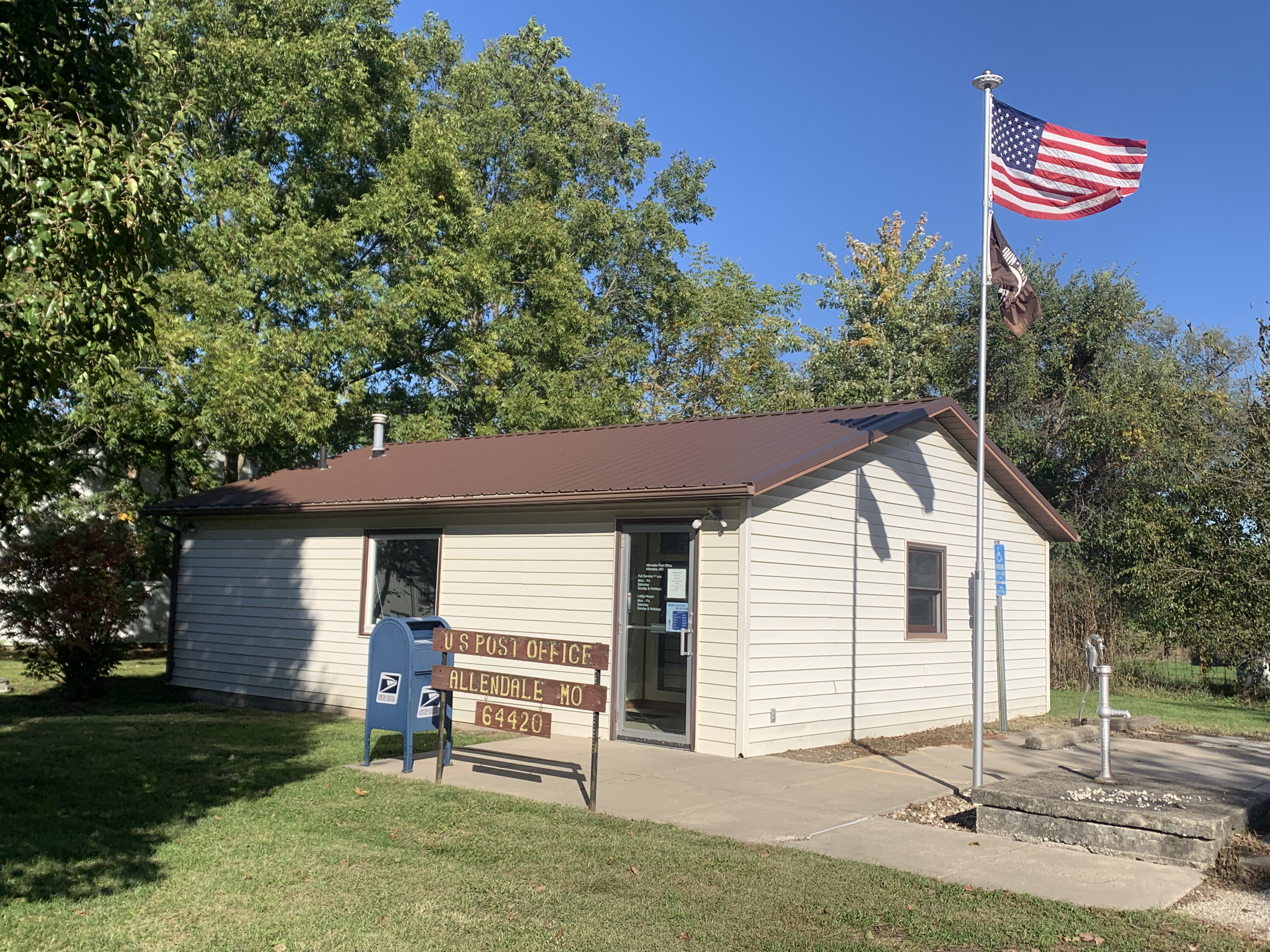
- Allendale Post Office, October 2025

- Location of Allendale, Missouri

- Location within Missouri Location within the United States Location within North America
- Coordinates: 40°29′07″N 94°17′19″W
- Country: United States
- State: Missouri
- County: Worth
- Township: Allendale
- Incorporated: 1928

Area
  - Total: 0.57 sq mi (1.47 km^{2})
  - Land: 0.57 sq mi (1.47 km^{2})
  - Water: 0 sq mi (0.00 km^{2})
- Elevation: 1,063 ft (324 m)

Population (2020)
  - Total: 48
  - Density: 84.6/sq mi (32.65/km^{2})
- Time zone: UTC-6 (Central (CST))
  - Summer (DST): UTC-5 (CDT)
- ZIP code: 64420
- Area code: 660
- FIPS code: 29-00712
- GNIS feature ID: 2397936

Allendale is a town in eastern Worth County, Missouri, United States. The population was 48 at the 2020 census.

== History ==
Allendale was platted in 1855 by Joel and William Allen, and named for them. It was initially named Allenville but was later changed to avoid mailing confusion with another town named Allenville. A post office called Allendale has been in operation since 1861. The population in the 1870s was about 300.

== Geography ==
Allendale is located on Missouri Route T just north of Missouri Route 46 six miles east of Grant City and 7.5 miles southwest of Hatfield in adjacent Harrison County.

According to the United States Census Bureau, the village has a total area of 0.57 square miles (1.48 km^{2}), all land.

== Demographics ==
Historical population
Census	Pop.	Note	%±
1910	243		—
1920	153		−37.0%
1930	166		8.5%
1940	212		27.7%
1950	142		−33.0%
1960	136		−4.2%
1970	104		−23.5%
1980	95		−8.7%
1990	58		−38.9%
2000	54		−6.9%
2010	53		−1.9%
2020	48		−9.4%
U.S. Decennial Census

=== 2010 census ===
As of the census of 2010, there were 52 people, 25 households, and 20 families residing in the village. The population density was 93.0 inhabitants per square mile (35.9/km^{2}). There were 35 housing units at an average density of 61.4 per square mile (23.7/km^{2}). The racial makeup of the village was 100.0% White.

There were 25 households, of which 12.0% had children under the age of 18 living with them, 76.0% were married couples living together, 4.0% had a male householder with no wife present, and 20.0% were non-families. 20.0% of all households were made up of individuals, and 4% had someone living alone who was 65 years of age or older. The average household size was 2.12 and the average family size was 2.40.

The median age in the village was 57.5 years. 15.1% of residents were under the age of 18; 0% were between the ages of 18 and 24; 17.1% were from 25 to 44; 39.6% were from 45 to 64; and 28.3% were 65 years of age or older. The gender makeup of the village was 50.9% male and 49.1% female.

=== 2000 census ===
As of the census of 2000, there were 54 people, 26 households, and 15 families residing in the town. The population density was 95.1 inhabitants per square mile (36.7/km^{2}). There were 35 housing units at an average density of 61.6 per square mile (23.8/km^{2}). The racial makeup of the town was 100 percent white.

There were 26 households, out of which 15.4% had children under the age of 18 living with them, 53.8% were married couples living together, 3.8% had a female householder with no husband present, and 42.3% were non-families. 34.6% of all households were made up of individuals, and 19.2% had someone living alone who was 65 years of age or older. The average household size was 2.08 and the average family size was 2.73.

In the town the population was spread out, with 16.7% under the age of 18, 3.7% from 18 to 24, 24.1% from 25 to 44, 31.5% from 45 to 64, and 24.1% who were 65 years of age or older. The median age was 51 years. For every 100 females, there are exactly 100 males. For every 100 females age 18 and over, there were 104.5 males.

As of 2000 the median income for a household was $30,833, and the median income for a family was $35,625. Males had a median income of $21,964 versus $14,375 for females. The per capita income for the town was $19,502. 3.1% of the population — but no families — are below the poverty line. Out of the total population, none are under the age of 18 or of those 65 and older were living below the poverty line.

== Arts and culture ==
According to tradition in Allendale, every 4th of July, men from the local community get together and cook a breakfast for everyone to enjoy.

== See also ==
- List of municipalities in Missouri
