= 1928 United States presidential election in Missouri =

- November 6, 1928

Nominee	Herbert Hoover	Al Smith
Party	Republican	Democratic
Home state	California	New York
Running mate	Charles Curtis	Joseph T. Robinson
Electoral vote	18	0
Popular vote	834,080	662,562
Percentage	55.58%	44.15%
County results
Hoover
40–50%
50–60%
60–70%
70–80%
80–90%
Smith
50–60%
60–70%
70–80%
President before election
Calvin Coolidge
Republican
Elected President
Herbert Hoover
Republican

The 1928 United States presidential election in Missouri was held on November 6, 1928, as part of the 1928 United States presidential election. Voters chose 18 electors to the Electoral College, who voted for president and vice president.

Missouri voted for the Republican nominee, former Secretary of Commerce Herbert Hoover of California, over the Democratic nominee, Governor Alfred E. Smith of New York.

Hoover won Missouri by a margin of 11.43 percent. This was the last time Missouri was won by a Republican candidate until Dwight Eisenhower narrowly won the state in 1952.

== Results ==
1928 United States presidential election in Missouri
Party	Candidate	Votes	Percentage	Electoral votes
Republican	Herbert Hoover	834,080	55.58%	18
Democratic	Al Smith	662,562	44.15%	0
Socialist	Norman Thomas	3,739	0.25%	0
Socialist Labor	Verne L. Reynolds	340	0.02%	0
Totals		1,497,721	100.00%	18

=== Results by county ===
1928 United States presidential election in Missouri by county
County	Herbert Clark Hoover Republican		Alfred Emmanuel Smith Democratic		Norman Mattoon Thomas Socialist		Verne L. Reynolds Socialist Labor		Margin		Total votes cast
County	#	%	#	%	#	%	#	%	#	%	Total votes cast
Adair	5,538	65.70%	2,841	33.71%	48	0.57%	2	0.02%	2,697	32.00%	8,429
Andrew	4,243	66.58%	2,118	33.23%	9	0.14%	3	0.05%	2,125	33.34%	6,373
Atchison	3,239	55.98%	2,535	43.81%	11	0.19%	1	0.02%	704	12.17%	5,786
Audrain	4,141	44.90%	5,067	54.94%	13	0.14%	1	0.01%	-926	-10.04%	9,222
Barry	5,901	62.89%	3,431	36.57%	51	0.54%	0	0.00%	2,470	26.32%	9,383
Barton	3,662	61.19%	2,275	38.01%	48	0.80%	0	0.00%	1,387	23.17%	5,985
Bates	6,133	62.70%	3,594	36.74%	48	0.49%	6	0.06%	2,539	25.96%	9,781
Benton	3,411	72.33%	1,296	27.48%	8	0.17%	1	0.02%	2,115	44.85%	4,716
Bollinger	3,014	62.20%	1,824	37.64%	7	0.14%	1	0.02%	1,190	24.56%	4,846
Boone	4,876	36.61%	8,422	63.23%	18	0.14%	3	0.02%	-3,546	-26.62%	13,319
Buchanan	20,459	62.71%	12,110	37.12%	49	0.15%	6	0.02%	8,349	25.59%	32,624
Butler	5,591	62.48%	3,320	37.10%	30	0.34%	8	0.09%	2,271	25.38%	8,949
Caldwell	4,167	65.82%	2,164	34.18%	0	0.00%	0	0.00%	2,003	31.64%	6,331
Callaway	3,269	38.75%	5,153	61.08%	13	0.15%	2	0.02%	-1,884	-22.33%	8,437
Camden	2,085	77.37%	606	22.49%	4	0.15%	0	0.00%	1,479	54.88%	2,695
Cape Girardeau	7,344	57.25%	5,464	42.59%	20	0.16%	1	0.01%	1,880	14.65%	12,829
Carroll	5,875	61.05%	3,735	38.81%	13	0.14%	1	0.01%	2,140	22.24%	9,624
Carter	989	50.41%	963	49.08%	8	0.41%	2	0.10%	26	1.33%	1,962
Cass	5,299	59.11%	3,647	40.68%	17	0.19%	1	0.01%	1,652	18.43%	8,964
Cedar	3,340	65.75%	1,728	34.02%	12	0.24%	0	0.00%	1,612	31.73%	5,080
Chariton	3,929	46.22%	4,559	53.63%	11	0.13%	2	0.02%	-630	-7.41%	8,501
Christian	3,576	75.75%	1,124	23.81%	21	0.44%	0	0.00%	2,452	51.94%	4,721
Clark	3,259	59.83%	2,170	39.84%	15	0.28%	3	0.06%	1,089	19.99%	5,447
Clay	5,584	49.92%	5,574	49.83%	26	0.23%	1	0.01%	10	0.09%	11,185
Clinton	3,736	59.98%	2,485	39.89%	4	0.06%	4	0.06%	1,251	20.08%	6,229
Cole	6,637	50.54%	6,481	49.35%	15	0.11%	0	0.00%	156	1.19%	13,133
Cooper	4,794	52.02%	4,413	47.88%	8	0.09%	1	0.01%	381	4.13%	9,216
Crawford	2,926	66.08%	1,476	33.33%	21	0.47%	5	0.11%	1,450	32.75%	4,428
Dade	3,497	70.55%	1,453	29.31%	7	0.14%	0	0.00%	2,044	41.23%	4,957
Dallas	2,835	74.94%	931	24.61%	15	0.40%	2	0.05%	1,904	50.33%	3,783
Daviess	4,254	60.28%	2,789	39.52%	12	0.17%	2	0.03%	1,465	20.76%	7,057
DeKalb	3,338	63.53%	1,898	36.12%	18	0.34%	0	0.00%	1,440	27.41%	5,254
Dent	2,367	55.49%	1,871	43.86%	23	0.54%	5	0.12%	496	11.63%	4,266
Douglas	3,758	84.00%	681	15.22%	33	0.74%	2	0.04%	3,077	68.78%	4,474
Dunklin	3,602	42.37%	4,879	57.39%	20	0.24%	0	0.00%	-1,277	-15.02%	8,501
Franklin	7,831	58.92%	5,429	40.84%	29	0.22%	3	0.02%	2,402	18.07%	13,292
Gasconade	4,171	79.57%	1,058	20.18%	11	0.21%	2	0.04%	3,113	59.39%	5,242
Gentry	3,506	56.04%	2,735	43.72%	15	0.24%	0	0.00%	771	12.32%	6,256
Greene	22,166	66.86%	10,901	32.88%	76	0.23%	8	0.02%	11,265	33.98%	33,151
Grundy	5,226	68.73%	2,332	30.67%	40	0.53%	6	0.08%	2,894	38.06%	7,604
Harrison	4,818	67.36%	2,319	32.42%	15	0.21%	1	0.01%	2,499	34.94%	7,153
Henry	6,263	59.07%	4,319	40.73%	20	0.19%	1	0.01%	1,944	18.33%	10,603
Hickory	2,233	84.68%	399	15.13%	5	0.19%	0	0.00%	1,834	69.55%	2,637
Holt	3,845	66.57%	1,919	33.22%	10	0.17%	2	0.03%	1,926	33.34%	5,776
Howard	2,254	33.54%	4,452	66.25%	12	0.18%	2	0.03%	-2,198	-32.71%	6,720
Howell	4,869	65.26%	2,543	34.08%	47	0.63%	2	0.03%	2,326	31.18%	7,461
Iron	1,910	58.68%	1,342	41.23%	3	0.09%	0	0.00%	568	17.45%	3,255
Jackson	126,589	56.59%	96,703	43.23%	355	0.16%	30	0.01%	29,886	13.36%	223,677
Jasper	20,587	70.85%	8,292	28.54%	171	0.59%	9	0.03%	12,295	42.31%	29,059
Jefferson	6,285	54.47%	5,231	45.34%	20	0.17%	2	0.02%	1,054	9.14%	11,538
Johnson	7,032	61.86%	4,316	37.97%	18	0.16%	1	0.01%	2,716	23.89%	11,367
Knox	2,628	54.21%	2,213	45.65%	7	0.14%	0	0.00%	415	8.56%	4,848
Laclede	3,971	65.91%	2,031	33.71%	21	0.35%	2	0.03%	1,940	32.20%	6,025
Lafayette	7,687	56.28%	5,939	43.48%	29	0.21%	3	0.02%	1,748	12.80%	13,658
Lawrence	6,328	63.17%	3,646	36.40%	42	0.42%	1	0.01%	2,682	26.77%	10,017
Lewis	2,741	48.55%	2,882	51.04%	22	0.39%	1	0.02%	-141	-2.50%	5,646
Lincoln	2,722	44.71%	3,356	55.12%	9	0.15%	1	0.02%	-634	-10.41%	6,088
Linn	6,996	61.31%	4,395	38.52%	20	0.18%	0	0.00%	2,601	22.79%	11,411
Livingston	5,742	63.94%	3,221	35.87%	15	0.17%	2	0.02%	2,521	28.07%	8,980
Macon	5,618	53.45%	4,838	46.03%	51	0.49%	3	0.03%	780	7.42%	10,510
Madison	2,165	62.02%	1,326	37.98%	0	0.00%	0	0.00%	839	24.03%	3,491
Maries	1,415	43.79%	1,808	55.96%	8	0.25%	0	0.00%	-393	-12.16%	3,231
Marion	7,664	57.34%	5,679	42.49%	24	0.18%	0	0.00%	1,985	14.85%	13,367
McDonald	3,684	64.79%	1,986	34.93%	16	0.28%	0	0.00%	1,698	29.86%	5,686
Mercer	2,869	75.54%	925	24.35%	4	0.11%	0	0.00%	1,944	51.18%	3,798
Miller	3,379	62.85%	1,979	36.81%	18	0.33%	0	0.00%	1,400	26.04%	5,376
Mississippi	1,999	43.37%	2,602	56.45%	8	0.17%	0	0.00%	-603	-13.08%	4,609
Moniteau	3,496	59.87%	2,310	39.56%	31	0.53%	2	0.03%	1,186	20.31%	5,839
Monroe	1,378	21.69%	4,957	78.01%	19	0.30%	0	0.00%	-3,579	-56.33%	6,354
Montgomery	3,910	63.03%	2,285	36.84%	5	0.08%	3	0.05%	1,625	26.20%	6,203
Morgan	3,017	67.68%	1,432	32.12%	9	0.20%	0	0.00%	1,585	35.55%	4,458
New Madrid	4,750	53.22%	4,153	46.53%	21	0.24%	1	0.01%	597	6.69%	8,925
Newton	7,054	67.77%	3,269	31.41%	82	0.79%	3	0.03%	3,785	36.37%	10,408
Nodaway	7,160	57.40%	5,297	42.46%	12	0.10%	5	0.04%	1,863	14.94%	12,474
Oregon	1,662	46.82%	1,884	53.07%	4	0.11%	0	0.00%	-222	-6.25%	3,550
Osage	2,474	44.40%	3,092	55.49%	6	0.11%	0	0.00%	-618	-11.09%	5,572
Ozark	2,616	82.68%	529	16.72%	17	0.54%	2	0.06%	2,087	65.96%	3,164
Pemiscot	6,256	54.33%	5,259	45.67%	0	0.00%	0	0.00%	997	8.66%	11,515
Perry	2,648	50.49%	2,591	49.40%	6	0.11%	0	0.00%	57	1.09%	5,245
Pettis	10,346	64.91%	5,554	34.85%	37	0.23%	2	0.01%	4,792	30.06%	15,939
Phelps	2,967	50.51%	2,896	49.30%	11	0.19%	0	0.00%	71	1.21%	5,874
Pike	4,569	54.74%	3,749	44.91%	29	0.35%	0	0.00%	820	9.82%	8,347
Platte	2,423	41.94%	3,344	57.88%	8	0.14%	2	0.03%	-921	-15.94%	5,777
Polk	5,307	69.63%	2,303	30.22%	12	0.16%	0	0.00%	3,004	39.41%	7,622
Pulaski	2,229	53.44%	1,934	46.37%	8	0.19%	0	0.00%	295	7.07%	4,171
Putnam	3,498	73.56%	1,247	26.23%	10	0.21%	0	0.00%	2,251	47.34%	4,755
Ralls	1,794	44.07%	2,273	55.83%	2	0.05%	2	0.05%	-479	-11.77%	4,071
Randolph	4,825	44.50%	6,008	55.41%	9	0.08%	0	0.00%	-1,183	-10.91%	10,842
Ray	3,280	41.70%	4,570	58.10%	14	0.18%	2	0.03%	-1,290	-16.40%	7,866
Reynolds	1,247	43.99%	1,582	55.80%	6	0.21%	0	0.00%	-335	-11.82%	2,835
Ripley	2,226	61.31%	1,395	38.42%	10	0.28%	0	0.00%	831	22.89%	3,631
Saint Charles	5,404	51.43%	5,081	48.36%	16	0.15%	6	0.06%	323	3.07%	10,507
Saint Clair	3,846	68.88%	1,701	30.46%	31	0.56%	6	0.11%	2,145	38.41%	5,584
Saint Francois	9,040	68.34%	4,171	31.53%	12	0.09%	5	0.04%	4,869	36.81%	13,228
Saint Louis	42,572	55.53%	33,802	44.09%	273	0.36%	20	0.03%	8,770	11.44%	76,667
Saint Louis City	161,701	47.67%	176,428	52.01%	945	0.28%	120	0.04%	-14,727	-4.34%	339,194
Sainte Genevieve	1,099	30.09%	2,547	69.74%	6	0.16%	0	0.00%	-1,448	-39.65%	3,652
Saline	6,780	51.98%	6,251	47.92%	13	0.10%	0	0.00%	529	4.06%	13,044
Schuyler	1,822	50.22%	1,797	49.53%	9	0.25%	0	0.00%	25	0.69%	3,628
Scotland	2,350	51.47%	2,194	48.05%	22	0.48%	0	0.00%	156	3.42%	4,566
Scott	3,779	42.25%	5,159	57.68%	5	0.06%	1	0.01%	-1,380	-15.43%	8,944
Shannon	1,542	44.62%	1,884	54.51%	29	0.84%	1	0.03%	-342	-9.90%	3,456
Shelby	2,303	42.12%	3,158	57.75%	7	0.13%	0	0.00%	-855	-15.64%	5,468
Stoddard	4,906	54.81%	4,016	44.87%	29	0.32%	0	0.00%	156	3.42%	8,951
Stone	2,972	83.88%	559	15.78%	12	0.34%	0	0.00%	2,413	68.11%	3,543
Sullivan	4,183	55.80%	3,292	43.92%	19	0.25%	2	0.03%	891	11.89%	7,496
Taney	2,319	70.23%	971	29.41%	10	0.30%	2	0.06%	1,348	40.82%	3,302
Texas	4,050	56.78%	3,067	43.00%	16	0.22%	0	0.00%	983	13.78%	7,133
Vernon	5,783	60.94%	3,676	38.74%	31	0.33%	0	0.00%	2,107	22.20%	9,490
Warren	2,610	72.10%	999	27.60%	11	0.30%	0	0.00%	1,611	44.50%	3,620
Washington	3,019	58.96%	2,091	40.84%	9	0.18%	1	0.02%	928	18.13%	5,120
Wayne	2,662	56.82%	2,011	42.92%	12	0.26%	0	0.00%	651	13.90%	4,685
Webster	4,002	62.99%	2,343	36.88%	6	0.09%	2	0.03%	1,659	26.11%	6,353
Worth	1,839	56.46%	1,407	43.20%	11	0.34%	0	0.00%	432	13.26%	3,257
Wright	4,504	69.28%	1,973	30.35%	21	0.32%	3	0.05%	2,531	38.93%	6,501
Totals	834,080	55.57%	662,684	44.15%	3,739	0.25%	342	0.02%	171,396	11.42%	1,500,845

== See also ==
- United States presidential elections in Missouri
