= Middlefork Township, Worth County, Missouri =

Township in Worth County, Missouri, U.S.

Middlefork Township
- Township
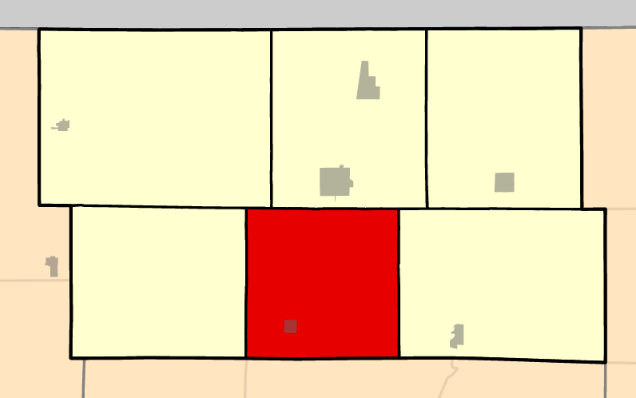
- Coordinates: 40°25′43″N 94°25′23″W
- Country: United States
- State: Missouri
- County: Worth

Area
  - Total: 34.46 sq mi (89.3 km^{2})
  - Land: 34.46 sq mi (89.3 km^{2})
  - Water: 0.0 sq mi (0 km^{2}) 0.0%
- Elevation: 1,020 ft (310 m)

Population (2020)
  - Total: 197
  - Density: 5.7/sq mi (2.2/km^{2})
- FIPS code: 29-22747828
- GNIS feature ID: 767542

Middlefork Township is a township in Worth County, Missouri, United States. At the 2020 census, its population was 197. The village of Worth lies in its southwest and the Grand River runs southerly through its middle to the east of Worth. It contains 36 sections with 11 being fractional.

Middlefork Township, previously known as Middle Fork Township, takes its name from the Middle Fork Grand River.

== Transportation ==
The following highways travel through the township:

- U.S. Route 169
- Route J
- Route M
- Route N
- Route W
- Route YY
- Route Z

== Gallery ==
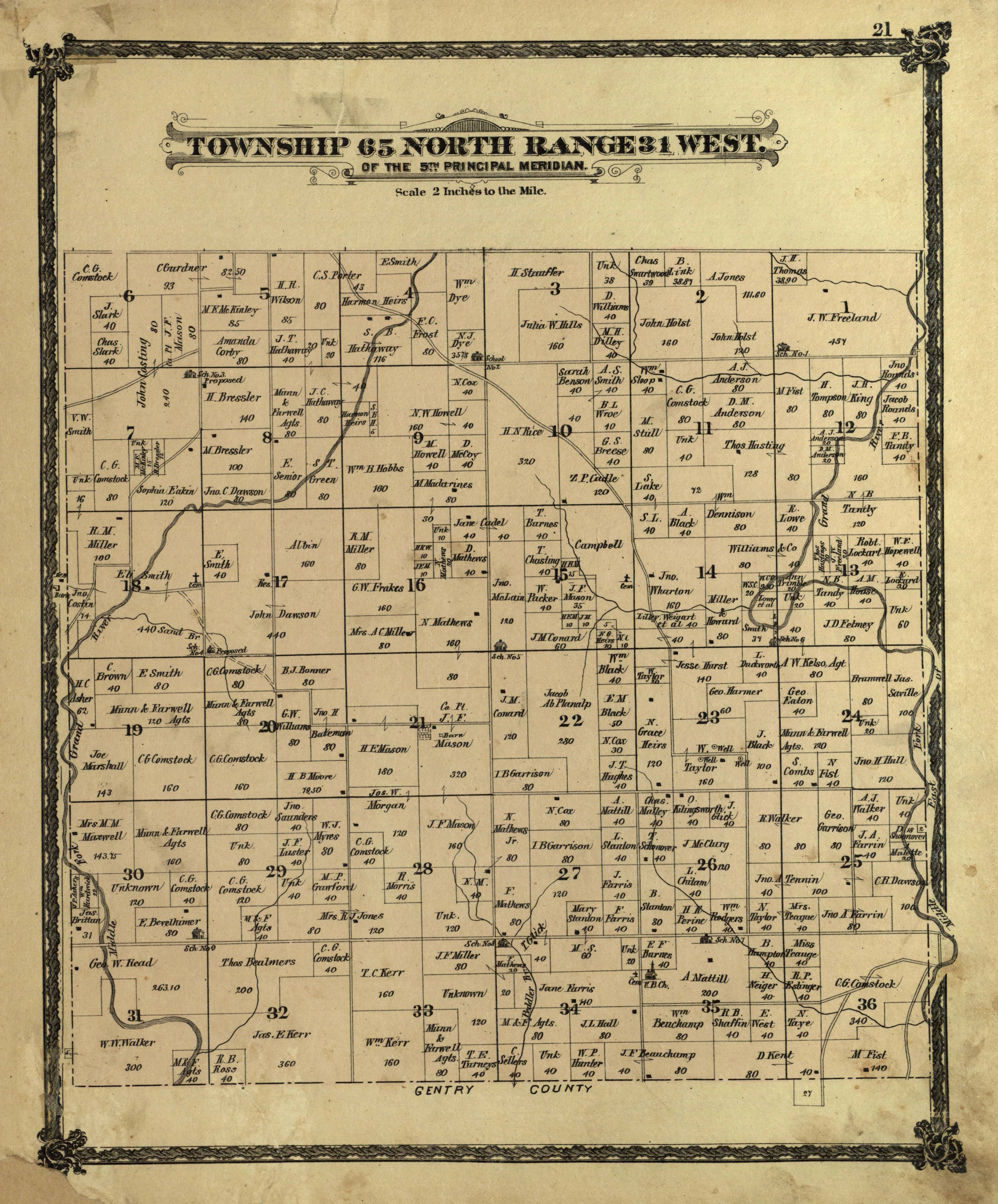
Township 65 North, Range 31 West of the 5th Principal Meridian

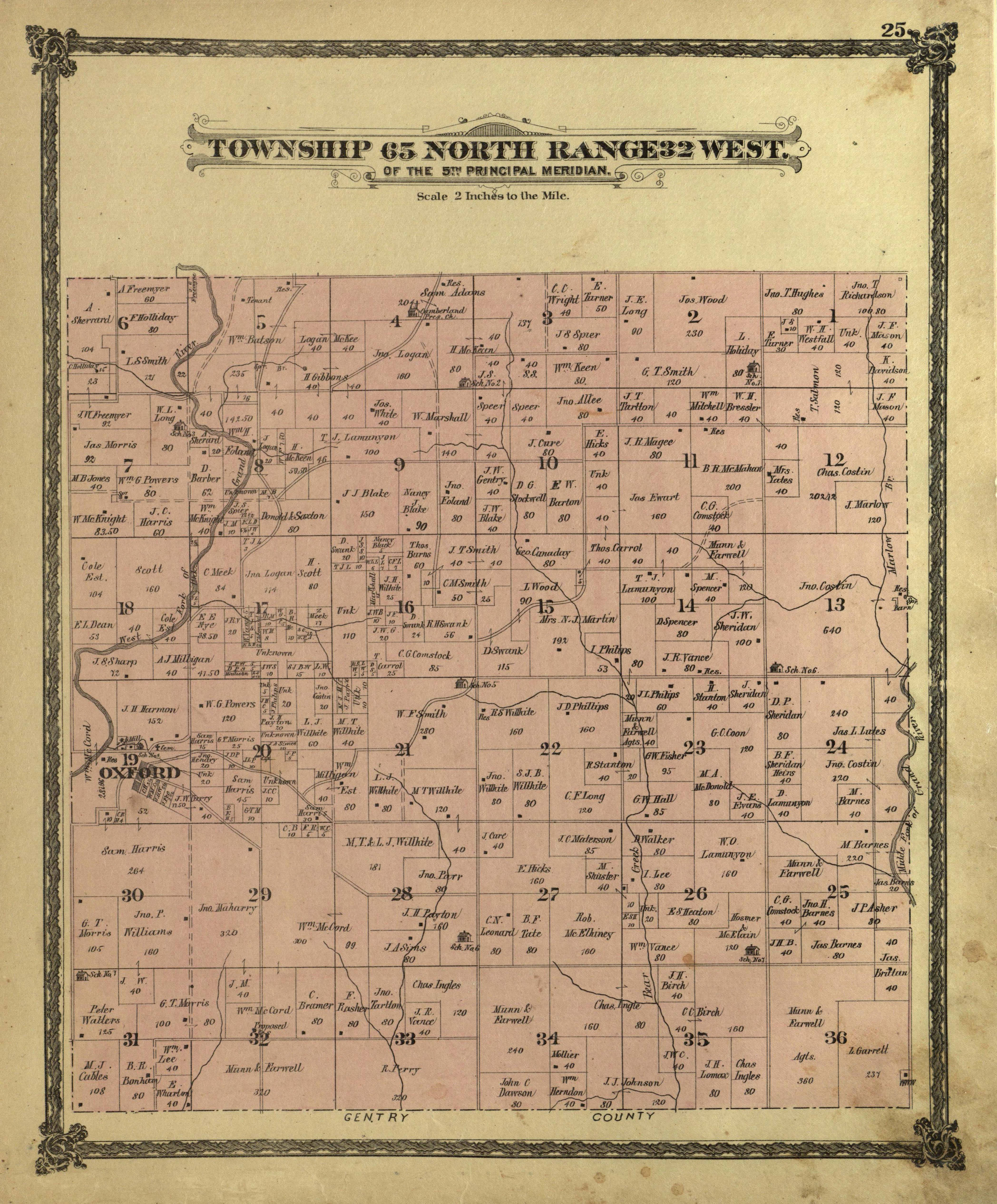
Township 65 North, Range 32 West of the 5th Principal Meridian
