= Worth County, Missouri =

County in Missouri, United States

- County
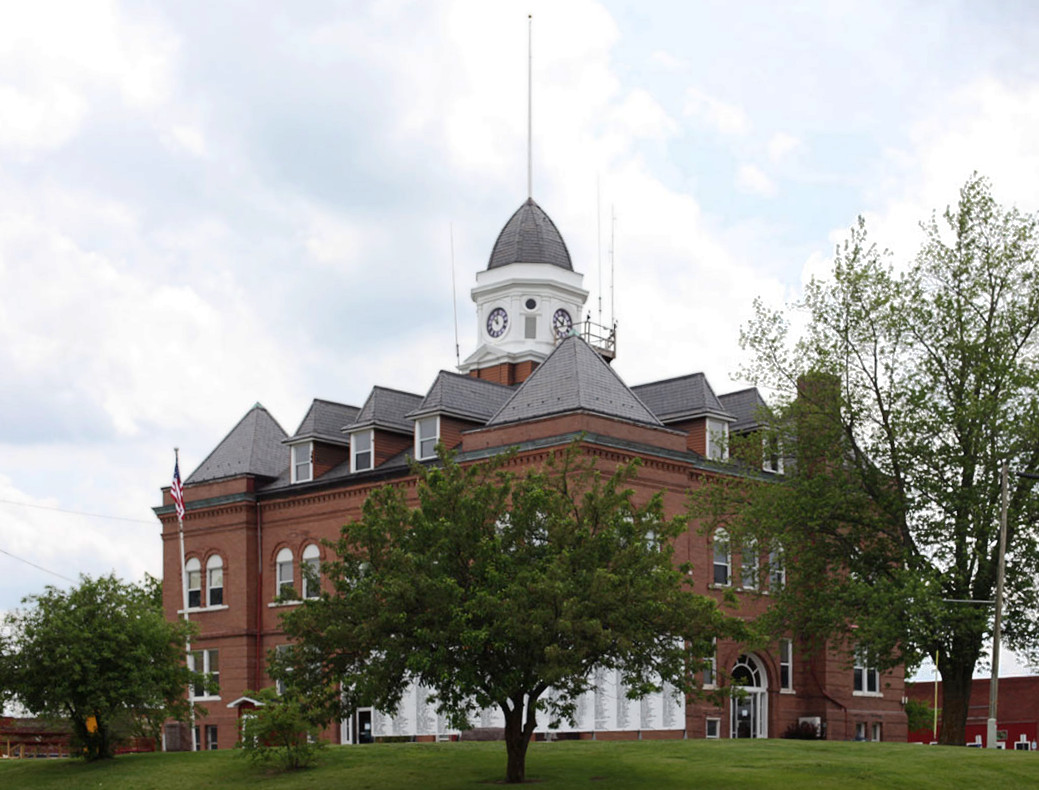
- Worth County Courthouse in Grant City

- Location within the U.S. state of Missouri
- Coordinates: 40°29′N 94°25′W
- Country: United States
- State: Missouri
- Founded: February 8, 1861
- Named for: William J. Worth
- Seat: Grant City
- Largest city: Grant City

Area
  - Total: 267 sq mi (690 km^{2})
  - Land: 267 sq mi (690 km^{2})
  - Water: 0.2 sq mi (0.52 km^{2}) 0.08%

Population (2020)
  - Total: 1,973
  - Estimate (2025): 1,914 ▼
  - Density: 7.39/sq mi (2.85/km^{2})
- Time zone: UTC−6 (Central)
  - Summer (DST): UTC−5 (CDT)
- Congressional district: 6th
- Website: www.worthcounty.us

Worth County is a county located in the northwestern portion of the U.S. state of Missouri. As of the 2020 census, the population was 1,973. According to the U.S. Census Bureau’s July 1, 2025 population estimates, Worth County’s population was 1,914, representing a decrease of about 3% since the 2020 census. It is the smallest county in the state in population and, excluding the independent city of St. Louis, the smallest in total area. Its county seat is Grant City. The county was organized on February 8, 1861, being split from Gentry County, and named for General William J. Worth, who served in the Mexican–American War. Worth County is also the youngest county in the state (again excluding the City of St. Louis, which became independent in 1876).

== Geography ==
According to the United States Census Bureau, the county has a total area of 267 square miles (690 km^{2}), of which 267 square miles (690 km^{2}) is land and 0.2 square miles (0.52 km^{2}) (0.08%) is water. It is the smallest county in Missouri by area. Iowa is located to the north of Worth County.

=== Adjacent counties ===
- Taylor County, Iowa (northwest)
- Ringgold County, Iowa (northeast)
- Harrison County (east)
- Gentry County (south)
- Nodaway County (west)

== Transportation ==
=== Major highways ===
- U.S. Route 169
- Route 46
- Route 246

== Demographics ==
Historical population
Census	Pop.	Note	%±
1870	5,004		—
1880	8,203		63.9%
1890	8,738		6.5%
1900	9,832		12.5%
1910	8,007		−18.6%
1920	7,642		−4.6%
1930	6,535		−14.5%
1940	6,345		−2.9%
1950	5,120		−19.3%
1960	3,936		−23.1%
1970	3,359		−14.7%
1980	3,008		−10.4%
1990	2,440		−18.9%
2000	2,382		−2.4%
2010	2,171		−8.9%
2020	1,973		−9.1%
2025 (est.)	1,914	▼	−3.0%
U.S. Decennial Census; 1790-1960 1900-1990; 1990-2000 2010-2020

=== 2020 census ===
As of the 2020 census, the county had a population of 1,973 and a median age of 47.8 years. 20.7% of residents were under the age of 18 and 24.5% were 65 years of age or older. For every 100 females there were 100.1 males, and for every 100 females age 18 and over there were 101.2 males age 18 and over.

The racial makeup of the county was 96.1% White, 0.0% Black or African American, 0.2% American Indian and Alaska Native, 0.3% Asian, 0.3% Native Hawaiian and Pacific Islander, 0.3% from some other race, and 2.8% from two or more races. Hispanic or Latino residents of any race comprised 1.3% of the population.

0.0% of residents lived in urban areas, while 100.0% lived in rural areas.

There were 876 households in the county, of which 26.6% had children under the age of 18 living with them and 24.0% had a female householder with no spouse or partner present. About 31.2% of all households were made up of individuals and 15.5% had someone living alone who was 65 years of age or older.

There were 1,114 housing units, of which 21.4% were vacant. Among occupied housing units, 75.5% were owner-occupied and 24.5% were renter-occupied. The homeowner vacancy rate was 0.6% and the rental vacancy rate was 7.1%.

=== Racial and ethnic composition ===
The following table shows the county's racial and ethnic composition from 1980 through 2020.

Worth County, Missouri – Racial and ethnic composition Note: the US Census treats Hispanic/Latino as an ethnic category. This table excludes Latinos from the racial categories and assigns them to a separate category. Hispanics/Latinos may be of any race.
Race / Ethnicity (NH = Non-Hispanic)	Pop 1980	Pop 1990	Pop 2000	Pop 2010	Pop 2020	% 1980	% 1990	% 2000	% 2010	% 2020
White alone (NH)	2,999	2,424	2,351	2,115	1,887	99.70%	99.34%	98.70%	97.42%	95.64%
Black or African American alone (NH)	1	1	4	11	0	0.03%	0.04%	0.17%	0.51%	0.00%
Native American or Alaska Native alone (NH)	0	1	8	5	4	0.00%	0.04%	0.34%	0.23%	0.20%
Asian alone (NH)	2	5	2	6	4	0.07%	0.20%	0.08%	0.28%	0.20%
Native Hawaiian or Pacific Islander alone (NH)	x	x	0	0	5	x	x	0.00%	0.00%	0.25%
Other race alone (NH)	1	0	0	3	0	0.03%	0.00%	0.00%	0.14%	0.00%
Mixed race or Multiracial (NH)	x	x	10	8	48	x	x	0.42%	0.37%	2.43%
Hispanic or Latino (any race)	5	9	7	23	25	0.17%	0.37%	0.29%	1.06%	1.27%
Total	3,008	2,440	2,382	2,171	1,973	100.00%	100.00%	100.00%	100.00%	100.00%

=== 2000 census ===
As of the census of 2000, there were 2,382 people, 1,009 households, and 677 families residing in the county. The population density was 9 people per square mile (3.5 people/km^{2}). There were 1,245 housing units at an average density of 5 units per square mile (1.9/km^{2}). The racial makeup of the county was 98.99% White, 0.17% Black or African American, 0.34% Native American, 0.08% Asian, and 0.42% from two or more races. Approximately 0.29% of the population were Hispanic or Latino of any race.

There were 1,009 households, out of which 28.90% had children under the age of 18 living with them, 56.40% were married couples living together, 7.70% had a female householder with no husband present, and 32.90% were non-families. 30.00% of all households were made up of individuals, and 16.70% had someone living alone who was 65 years of age or older. The average household size was 2.31 and the average family size was 2.85.

In the county, the population was spread out, with 24.30% under the age of 18, 6.80% from 18 to 24, 23.50% from 25 to 44, 23.10% from 45 to 64, and 22.30% who were 65 years of age or older. The median age was 42 years. For every 100 females there were 96.00 males. For every 100 females age 18 and over, there were 90.60 males.

The median income for a household in the county was $27,471, and the median income for a family was $34,044. Males had a median income of $24,138 versus $17,300 for females. The per capita income for the county was $14,367. About 10.90% of families and 14.30% of the population were below the poverty line, including 18.80% of those under age 18 and 11.50% of those age 65 or over.

== Education ==
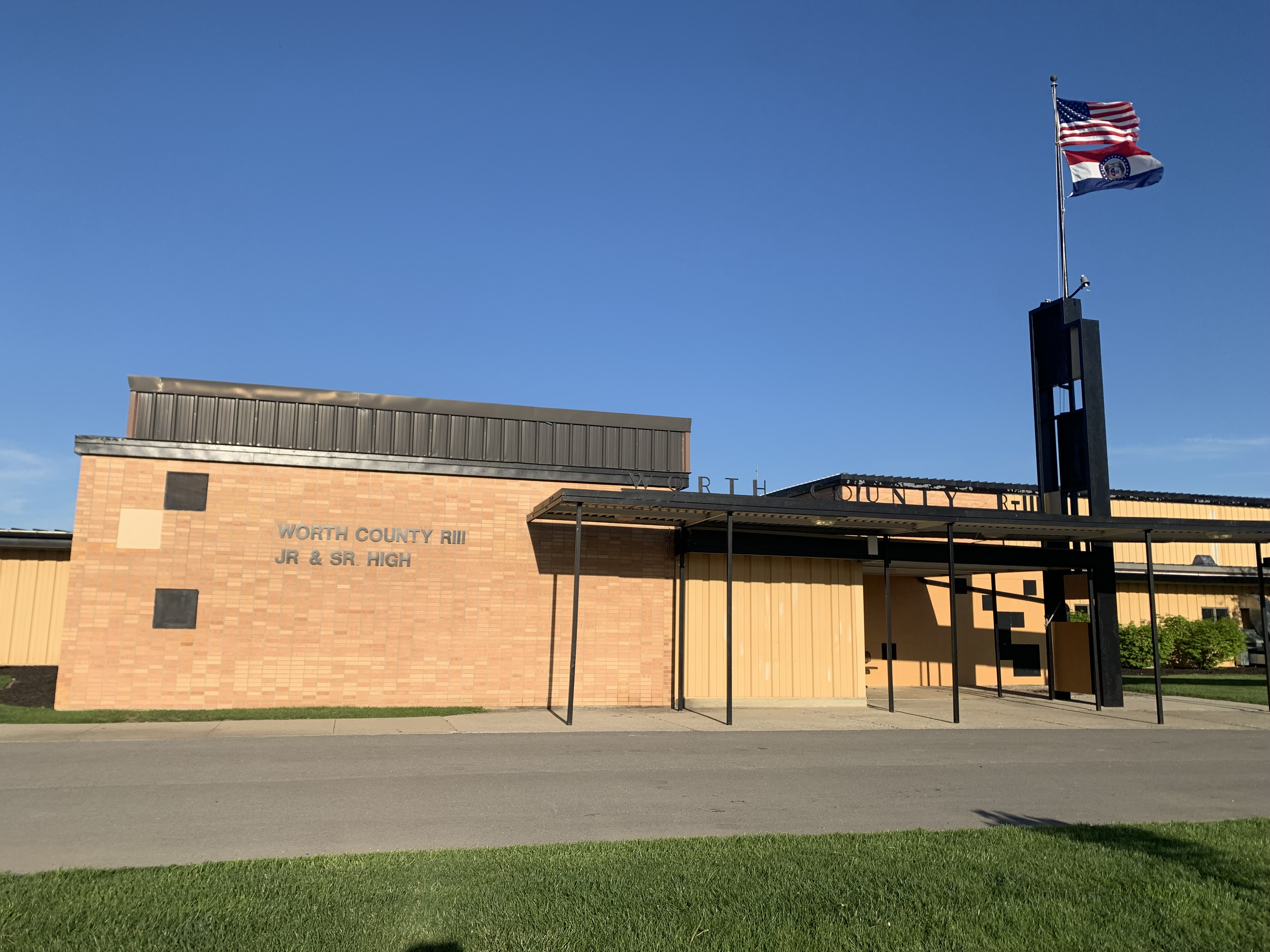
Grant City High School

=== Public schools ===
- Worth County R-III School District – Grant City
  - Worth County Elementary School (PK–6)
  - Worth County High School (7–12)

=== Public libraries ===
- Worth County Library Association

== Communities ==
=== Cities ===
- Grant City (county seat)
- Sheridan
- Allendale

=== Villages ===
- Denver
- Irena
- Worth

=== Extinct Places ===
- Defiance
- Isadora
- Oxford
- Prohibition City

=== Townships ===
- Allen
- Fletchall
- Greene
- Middlefork
- Smith
- Union

=== Population ranking ===
The population ranking of the following table is based on the 2020 census of Worth County.

† county seat

Rank	Name	Municipal Type	Population
1	Grant City †	4th Class City	817
2	Sheridan	4th Class City	145
3	Worth	Village	65
4	Allendale	3rd Class City	48
5	Denver	Village	32
6	Irena	Village	14

== Politics ==
=== Local ===
The Republican Party controls politics at the local level in Worth County. Republicans hold the majority of elected positions in the county.

Worth County, Missouri

Elected countywide officials
Assessor	Tresha Petty	Republican
Circuit Clerk	Jana Findley	Republican
County Clerk	Roberta Owens	Republican
Collector	Jessica Davidson	Republican
Commissioner (presiding)	Jubal Summers	Republican
Commissioner (district 1)	Regan Nonneman	Republican
Commissioner (district 2)	Tyler Paxson	Republican
Coroner	Sharon Paxson	Republican
Prosecuting Attorney	Janet Wake Larison	Democratic
Public Administrator	Patsy A. Worthington	Republican
Recorder	Amanda Gilland	Democratic
Sheriff	Scott Sherer	Republican
Surveyor	NA	Republican
Treasurer	Stephanie Hardy	Republican

=== State ===
Past Gubernatorial Elections Results
Year	Republican	Democratic	Third Parties
2024	81.37% 878	17.05% 184	1.58% 17
2020	79.36% 869	18.72% 205	1.92% 21
2016	68.79% 714	28.23% 293	2.98% 31
2012	50.14% 524	46.51% 486	3.35% 35
2008	48.95% 559	47.99% 548	3.06% 35
2004	58.43% 662	40.69% 461	0.88% 10
2000	49.16% 557	48.72% 461	2.12% 24
1996	34.11% 425	64.37% 802	1.52% 19

Worth County is part of the 1st district in the Missouri House of Representatives, currently held by Jeff Farnan (R-Stanberry).

Missouri House of Representatives — District 1 — Worth County (2016)
Party	Candidate	Votes	%	±%
Republican	Allen Andrews	970	100.00%	+16.01

Missouri House of Representatives — District 1 — Worth County (2014)
Party	Candidate	Votes	%	±%
Republican	Allen Andrews	640	83.99%	−16.01
Democratic	Robert Ritterbusch	122	16.01%	+16.01

Missouri House of Representatives — District 1 — Worth County (2012)
Party	Candidate	Votes	%	±%
Republican	Mike Thomson	946	100.00%	

Worth County is part of the 12th District in the Missouri Senate, currently held by Dan Hegeman (R-Cosby).

Missouri Senate — District 12 — Worth County (2014)
Party	Candidate	Votes	%	±%
Republican	Dan Hegeman	618	100.00%	

=== Federal ===
U.S. Senate — Missouri — Worth County (2016)
Party	Candidate	Votes	%	±%
Republican	Roy Blunt	667	64.51%	+21.42
Democratic	Jason Kander	321	31.04%	−18.20
Libertarian	Jonathan Dine	30	2.90%	−4.59
Green	Johnathan McFarland	5	0.48%	+0.48
Constitution	Fred Ryman	11	1.06	+1.06

U.S. Senate — Missouri — Worth County (2012)
Party	Candidate	Votes	%	±%
Republican	Todd Akin	449	43.09	
Democratic	Claire McCaskill	515	49.24	
Libertarian	Jonathan Dine	78	7.49	

Worth County is included in Missouri's 6th Congressional District and is currently represented by Sam Graves (R-Tarkio) in the U.S. House of Representatives.

U.S. House of Representatives — Missouri's 6th Congressional District — Worth County (2016)
Party	Candidate	Votes	%	±%
Republican	Sam Graves	780	75.80%	+9.93
Democratic	David M. Blackwell	206	20.02%	−7.34
Libertarian	Russ Lee Monchil	29	2.82%	−3.95
Green	Mike Diel	14	1.36%	+1.36

U.S. House of Representatives — Missouri’s 6th Congressional District — Worth County (2014)
Party	Candidate	Votes	%	±%
Republican	Sam Graves	496	65.87%	−1.69
Democratic	Bill Hedge	206	27.36%	−1.92
Libertarian	Russ Lee Monchil	51	6.77%	+3.61

U.S. House of Representatives — Missouri's 6th Congressional District — Worth County (2012)
Party	Candidate	Votes	%	±%
Republican	Sam Graves	706	67.56%	
Democratic	Kyle Yarber	306	29.28%	
Libertarian	Russ Lee Monchil	33	3.16%	

United States presidential election results for Worth County, Missouri
Year	Republican		Democratic		Third party(ies)	
Year	No.	%	No.	%	No.	%
1888	771	44.41%	789	45.45%	176	10.14%
1892	624	33.46%	696	37.32%	545	29.22%
1896	885	41.24%	1,248	58.15%	13	0.61%
1900	1,023	45.73%	1,123	50.20%	91	4.07%
1904	1,042	49.78%	967	46.20%	84	4.01%
1908	985	48.43%	993	48.82%	56	2.75%
1912	769	39.11%	973	49.49%	224	11.39%
1916	892	44.29%	1,079	53.57%	43	2.14%
1920	1,888	54.72%	1,532	44.41%	30	0.87%
1924	1,666	49.66%	1,650	49.18%	39	1.16%
1928	1,839	56.46%	1,407	43.20%	11	0.34%
1932	1,041	36.90%	1,763	62.50%	17	0.60%
1936	1,581	44.46%	1,944	54.67%	31	0.87%
1940	1,807	51.44%	1,702	48.45%	4	0.11%
1944	1,444	50.12%	1,437	49.88%	0	0.00%
1948	1,162	42.53%	1,563	57.21%	7	0.26%
1952	1,682	57.72%	1,227	42.11%	5	0.17%
1956	1,338	49.70%	1,354	50.30%	0	0.00%
1960	1,355	50.60%	1,323	49.40%	0	0.00%
1964	831	37.70%	1,373	62.30%	0	0.00%
1968	924	48.55%	853	44.82%	126	6.62%
1972	1,170	61.68%	727	38.32%	0	0.00%
1976	771	44.08%	969	55.40%	9	0.51%
1980	833	50.27%	760	45.87%	64	3.86%
1984	921	55.65%	734	44.35%	0	0.00%
1988	677	47.98%	732	51.88%	2	0.14%
1992	483	34.18%	599	42.39%	331	23.43%
1996	540	42.42%	572	44.93%	161	12.65%
2000	651	56.22%	469	40.50%	38	3.28%
2004	691	61.04%	436	38.52%	5	0.44%
2008	707	60.22%	427	36.37%	40	3.41%
2012	664	63.36%	341	32.54%	43	4.10%
2016	808	77.25%	195	18.64%	43	4.11%
2020	877	79.22%	215	19.42%	15	1.36%
2024	904	81.81%	190	17.19%	11	1.00%

=== Missouri presidential preference primary (2008) ===
Former U.S. Senator Hillary Clinton (D-New York) received more votes, a total of 171, than any candidate from either party in Worth County during the 2008 presidential primary.

== See also ==
- National Register of Historic Places listings in Worth County, Missouri
