= 1940 United States presidential election in Missouri =

- November 5, 1940

Nominee	Franklin D. Roosevelt	Wendell Willkie
Party	Democratic	Republican
Home state	New York	New York
Running mate	Henry A. Wallace	Charles L. McNary
Electoral vote	15	0
Popular vote	958,476	871,009
Percentage	52.27%	47.50%
County results
Roosevelt
50–60%
60–70%
70–80%
80–90%
Willkie
50–60%
60–70%
70–80%
80–90%
President before election
Franklin D. Roosevelt
Democratic
Elected President
Franklin D. Roosevelt
Democratic

The 1940 United States presidential election in Missouri took place on November 5, 1940, as part of the 1940 United States presidential election. Voters chose 15 representatives, or electors, to the Electoral College, who voted for president and vice president.

Missouri was won by incumbent President Franklin D. Roosevelt (D–New York), running with Secretary Henry A. Wallace, with 52.27 percent of the popular vote, against Wendell Willkie (R–New York), running with Minority Leader Charles L. McNary, with 47.50 percent of the popular vote.

Despite his victory, Roosevelt carried Missouri by a greatly reduced margin than he had four years prior, defeating Willkie by less than five percentage points, In 1936, Roosevelt had defeated Alf Landon in the state by more than 22 percentage points and with over 60% of the vote.

== Results ==
1940 United States presidential election in Missouri
Party	Candidate	Votes	%
Democratic	Franklin D. Roosevelt (inc.)	958,476	52.27%
Republican	Wendell Willkie	871,009	47.50%
Socialist	Norman Thomas	2,226	0.12%
Prohibition	Roger Babson	1,809	0.10%
Socialist Labor	John W. Aiken	209	0.01%
Total votes		1,833,729	100%

=== Results by county ===
1940 United States presidential election in Missouri by county
County	Franklin D. Roosevelt Democratic		Wendell Willkie Republican		Norman Thomas Socialist		Roger Babson Prohibition		John W. Aiken Socialist Labor		Margin		Total votes cast
County	#	%	#	%	#	%	#	%	#	%	#	%	Total votes cast
Adair	4,813	45.55%	5,688	53.83%	28	0.27%	36	0.34%	1	0.01%	-875	-8.28%	10,566
Andrew	3,059	41.04%	4,384	58.81%	3	0.04%	8	0.11%	0	0.00%	-1,325	-17.78%	7,454
Atchison	3,025	47.58%	3,322	52.25%	4	0.06%	7	0.11%	0	0.00%	-297	-4.67%	6,358
Audrain	7,768	69.21%	3,447	30.71%	4	0.04%	5	0.04%	0	0.00%	4,321	38.50%	11,224
Barry	5,207	44.11%	6,573	55.68%	9	0.08%	15	0.13%	0	0.00%	-1,366	-11.57%	11,804
Barton	3,539	48.38%	3,737	51.09%	15	0.21%	22	0.30%	2	0.03%	-198	-2.71%	7,315
Bates	4,978	46.36%	5,727	53.33%	10	0.09%	23	0.21%	0	0.00%	-749	-6.98%	10,738
Benton	1,765	30.99%	3,912	68.69%	9	0.16%	7	0.12%	2	0.04%	-2,147	-37.70%	5,695
Bollinger	2,511	42.32%	3,415	57.55%	4	0.07%	4	0.07%	0	0.00%	-904	-15.23%	5,934
Boone	11,615	70.21%	4,869	29.43%	31	0.19%	26	0.16%	2	0.01%	6,746	40.78%	16,543
Buchanan	24,482	58.30%	17,484	41.63%	16	0.04%	12	0.03%	1	0.00%	6,998	16.66%	41,995
Butler	6,213	43.52%	8,024	56.21%	15	0.11%	23	0.16%	0	0.00%	-1,811	-12.69%	14,275
Caldwell	2,728	40.64%	3,976	59.23%	6	0.09%	3	0.04%	0	0.00%	-1,248	-18.59%	6,713
Callaway	7,162	66.58%	3,574	33.22%	9	0.08%	12	0.11%	0	0.00%	3,588	33.36%	10,757
Camden	1,549	36.48%	2,692	63.40%	2	0.05%	2	0.05%	1	0.02%	-1,143	-26.92%	4,246
Cape Girardeau	8,642	48.07%	9,297	51.71%	19	0.11%	18	0.10%	2	0.01%	-655	-3.64%	17,978
Carroll	4,446	42.52%	6,000	57.38%	2	0.02%	9	0.09%	0	0.00%	-1,554	-14.86%	10,457
Carter	1,499	55.58%	1,195	44.31%	1	0.04%	2	0.07%	0	0.00%	304	11.27%	2,697
Cass	5,479	52.29%	4,983	47.55%	12	0.11%	5	0.05%	0	0.00%	496	4.73%	10,479
Cedar	1,973	32.49%	4,068	66.99%	15	0.25%	16	0.26%	1	0.02%	-2,095	-34.50%	6,073
Chariton	5,053	53.21%	4,439	46.74%	2	0.02%	2	0.02%	1	0.01%	614	6.47%	9,497
Christian	1,729	27.65%	4,509	72.11%	7	0.11%	7	0.11%	1	0.02%	-2,780	-44.46%	6,253
Clark	2,728	46.10%	3,171	53.59%	8	0.14%	10	0.17%	0	0.00%	-443	-7.49%	5,917
Clay	9,672	60.98%	6,159	38.83%	11	0.07%	19	0.12%	0	0.00%	3,513	22.15%	15,861
Clinton	3,800	55.50%	3,030	44.25%	5	0.07%	12	0.18%	0	0.00%	770	11.25%	6,847
Cole	8,219	51.72%	7,664	48.23%	2	0.01%	7	0.04%	0	0.00%	555	3.49%	15,892
Cooper	4,606	44.53%	5,720	55.30%	2	0.02%	13	0.13%	2	0.02%	-1,114	-10.77%	10,343
Crawford	2,736	42.99%	3,615	56.79%	8	0.13%	5	0.08%	1	0.02%	-879	-13.81%	6,365
Dade	1,835	31.85%	3,910	67.87%	5	0.09%	11	0.19%	0	0.00%	-2,075	-36.02%	5,761
Dallas	1,566	28.81%	3,859	71.00%	7	0.13%	3	0.06%	0	0.00%	-2,293	-42.19%	5,435
Daviess	3,325	43.61%	4,289	56.25%	3	0.04%	6	0.08%	2	0.03%	-964	-12.64%	7,625
DeKalb	2,505	44.79%	3,072	54.93%	5	0.09%	10	0.18%	1	0.02%	-567	-10.14%	5,593
Dent	3,101	53.78%	2,652	45.99%	9	0.16%	3	0.05%	1	0.02%	449	7.79%	5,766
Douglas	1,350	21.59%	4,870	77.90%	21	0.34%	10	0.16%	1	0.02%	-3,520	-56.30%	6,252
Dunklin	11,132	66.74%	5,516	33.07%	14	0.08%	18	0.11%	0	0.00%	5,616	33.67%	16,680
Franklin	7,237	41.22%	10,283	58.58%	23	0.13%	9	0.05%	3	0.02%	-3,046	-17.35%	17,555
Gasconade	1,163	17.89%	5,333	82.03%	5	0.08%	0	0.00%	0	0.00%	-4,170	-64.14%	6,501
Gentry	3,689	51.57%	3,446	48.17%	9	0.13%	9	0.13%	1	0.01%	243	3.40%	7,154
Greene	22,130	50.65%	21,456	49.10%	37	0.08%	70	0.16%	2	0.00%	674	1.54%	43,695
Grundy	3,813	45.37%	4,558	54.24%	7	0.08%	26	0.31%	0	0.00%	-745	-8.86%	8,404
Harrison	3,325	38.50%	5,304	61.42%	7	0.08%	0	0.00%	0	0.00%	-1,979	-22.92%	8,636
Henry	6,069	48.85%	6,332	50.97%	11	0.09%	11	0.09%	0	0.00%	-263	-2.12%	12,423
Hickory	787	23.91%	2,496	75.84%	3	0.09%	5	0.15%	0	0.00%	-1,709	-51.93%	3,291
Holt	2,677	41.68%	3,739	58.22%	2	0.03%	4	0.06%	0	0.00%	-1,062	-16.54%	6,422
Howard	4,770	66.97%	2,333	32.75%	12	0.17%	7	0.10%	1	0.01%	2,437	34.21%	7,123
Howell	4,218	40.57%	6,158	59.23%	10	0.10%	11	0.11%	0	0.00%	-1,940	-18.66%	10,397
Iron	2,495	54.65%	2,062	45.17%	2	0.04%	5	0.11%	1	0.02%	433	9.49%	4,565
Jackson	137,285	57.39%	101,568	42.46%	184	0.08%	157	0.07%	25	0.01%	35,717	14.93%	239,219
Jasper	18,249	48.83%	18,755	50.19%	50	0.13%	57	0.15%	0	0.00%	-506	-1.35%	37,370
Jefferson	9,553	55.82%	7,517	43.92%	28	0.16%	16	0.09%	1	0.01%	2,036	11.90%	17,115
Johnson	5,441	45.62%	6,468	54.23%	8	0.07%	11	0.09%	0	0.00%	-1,027	-8.61%	11,928
Knox	2,594	52.06%	2,370	47.56%	19	0.38%	0	0.00%	0	0.00%	224	4.50%	4,983
Laclede	3,323	40.14%	4,941	59.69%	5	0.06%	9	0.11%	0	0.00%	-1,618	-19.55%	8,278
Lafayette	6,913	43.91%	8,802	55.91%	19	0.12%	8	0.05%	2	0.01%	-1,889	-12.00%	15,744
Lawrence	5,279	41.76%	7,317	57.88%	5	0.04%	39	0.31%	1	0.01%	-2,038	-16.12%	12,641
Lewis	3,484	58.63%	2,428	40.86%	9	0.15%	21	0.35%	0	0.00%	1,056	17.77%	5,942
Lincoln	4,420	59.09%	3,035	40.57%	5	0.07%	18	0.24%	2	0.03%	1,385	18.52%	7,480
Linn	6,246	52.34%	5,664	47.46%	9	0.08%	15	0.13%	0	0.00%	582	4.88%	11,934
Livingston	4,633	46.53%	5,298	53.21%	6	0.06%	19	0.19%	0	0.00%	-665	-6.68%	9,956
Macon	6,120	53.13%	5,384	46.74%	10	0.09%	4	0.03%	1	0.01%	736	6.39%	11,519
Madison	2,405	49.03%	2,495	50.87%	1	0.02%	4	0.08%	0	0.00%	-90	-1.83%	4,905
Maries	2,078	54.17%	1,749	45.59%	1	0.03%	8	0.21%	0	0.00%	329	8.58%	3,836
Marion	9,723	62.09%	5,892	37.62%	12	0.08%	33	0.21%	0	0.00%	3,831	24.46%	15,660
McDonald	3,312	44.79%	4,063	54.95%	8	0.11%	11	0.15%	0	0.00%	-751	-10.16%	7,394
Mercer	1,364	32.78%	2,787	66.98%	4	0.10%	4	0.10%	2	0.05%	-1,423	-34.20%	4,161
Miller	3,113	43.80%	3,971	55.87%	9	0.13%	14	0.20%	0	0.00%	-858	-12.07%	7,107
Mississippi	4,362	58.46%	3,073	41.18%	4	0.05%	21	0.28%	2	0.03%	1,289	17.27%	7,462
Moniteau	2,922	44.57%	3,627	55.32%	3	0.05%	3	0.05%	1	0.02%	-705	-10.75%	6,556
Monroe	6,018	83.23%	1,200	16.60%	5	0.07%	8	0.11%	0	0.00%	4,818	66.63%	7,231
Montgomery	3,205	44.82%	3,930	54.96%	7	0.10%	8	0.11%	1	0.01%	-725	-10.14%	7,151
Morgan	2,376	42.76%	3,166	56.98%	6	0.11%	7	0.13%	1	0.02%	-790	-14.22%	5,556
New Madrid	9,591	60.20%	6,318	39.65%	6	0.04%	18	0.11%	0	0.00%	3,273	20.54%	15,933
Newton	6,256	43.55%	8,064	56.14%	21	0.15%	21	0.15%	2	0.01%	-1,808	-12.59%	14,364
Nodaway	6,696	49.74%	6,759	50.21%	4	0.03%	2	0.01%	0	0.00%	-63	-0.47%	13,461
Oregon	3,593	66.12%	1,826	33.60%	2	0.04%	13	0.24%	0	0.00%	1,767	32.52%	5,434
Osage	2,332	38.32%	3,743	61.50%	8	0.13%	3	0.05%	0	0.00%	-1,411	-23.18%	6,086
Ozark	965	21.91%	3,421	77.66%	11	0.25%	6	0.14%	2	0.05%	-2,456	-55.75%	4,405
Pemiscot	9,391	60.77%	6,011	38.90%	10	0.06%	41	0.27%	0	0.00%	3,380	21.87%	15,453
Perry	2,354	33.54%	4,656	66.33%	7	0.10%	2	0.03%	0	0.00%	-2,302	-32.80%	7,019
Pettis	8,570	48.99%	8,905	50.91%	6	0.03%	11	0.06%	0	0.00%	-335	-1.92%	17,492
Phelps	4,780	58.91%	3,319	40.90%	8	0.10%	5	0.06%	2	0.02%	1,461	18.01%	8,114
Pike	5,742	60.51%	3,707	39.07%	14	0.15%	25	0.26%	1	0.01%	2,035	21.45%	9,489
Platte	4,635	64.44%	2,545	35.38%	13	0.18%	0	0.00%	0	0.00%	2,090	29.06%	7,193
Polk	3,380	37.86%	5,534	61.98%	7	0.08%	7	0.08%	0	0.00%	-2,154	-24.13%	8,928
Pulaski	2,752	53.68%	2,367	46.17%	5	0.10%	3	0.06%	0	0.00%	385	7.51%	5,127
Putnam	1,708	30.71%	3,828	68.84%	17	0.31%	8	0.14%	0	0.00%	-2,120	-38.12%	5,561
Ralls	3,562	71.53%	1,412	28.35%	2	0.04%	4	0.08%	0	0.00%	2,150	43.17%	4,980
Randolph	9,155	73.26%	3,319	26.56%	4	0.03%	19	0.15%	0	0.00%	5,836	46.70%	12,497
Ray	5,786	62.88%	3,399	36.94%	4	0.04%	11	0.12%	1	0.01%	2,387	25.94%	9,201
Reynolds	2,406	66.83%	1,187	32.97%	1	0.03%	6	0.17%	0	0.00%	1,219	33.86%	3,600
Ripley	2,419	51.20%	2,291	48.49%	14	0.30%	1	0.02%	0	0.00%	128	2.71%	4,725
Saint Charles	5,334	40.48%	7,792	59.14%	41	0.31%	5	0.04%	4	0.03%	-2,458	-18.66%	13,176
Saint Clair	2,859	41.83%	3,950	57.80%	7	0.10%	17	0.25%	1	0.01%	-1,091	-15.96%	6,834
Saint Francois	8,132	48.26%	8,687	51.55%	13	0.08%	19	0.11%	0	0.00%	-555	-3.29%	16,851
Saint Louis County	52,380	43.74%	66,909	55.88%	330	0.28%	110	0.09%	18	0.02%	-14,529	-12.13%	119,747
Saint Louis City	233,338	57.98%	168,165	41.79%	652	0.16%	209	0.05%	87	0.02%	65,173	16.19%	402,451
Sainte Genevieve	2,098	43.20%	2,750	56.63%	8	0.16%	0	0.00%	0	0.00%	-652	-13.43%	4,856
Saline	7,988	52.03%	7,336	47.79%	6	0.04%	22	0.14%	0	0.00%	652	4.25%	15,352
Schuyler	1,998	53.31%	1,732	46.21%	10	0.27%	7	0.19%	1	0.03%	266	7.10%	3,748
Scotland	2,435	50.87%	2,329	48.65%	12	0.25%	10	0.21%	1	0.02%	106	2.21%	4,787
Scott	7,899	64.00%	4,401	35.66%	18	0.15%	22	0.18%	2	0.02%	3,498	28.34%	12,342
Shannon	2,806	63.44%	1,589	35.93%	20	0.45%	8	0.18%	0	0.00%	1,217	27.52%	4,423
Shelby	4,028	64.75%	2,167	34.83%	3	0.05%	23	0.37%	0	0.00%	1,861	29.91%	6,221
Stoddard	6,725	52.47%	6,055	47.24%	19	0.15%	18	0.14%	1	0.01%	670	5.23%	12,818
Stone	1,041	22.40%	3,598	77.43%	6	0.13%	2	0.04%	0	0.00%	-2,557	-55.02%	4,647
Sullivan	3,743	47.77%	4,080	52.07%	2	0.03%	11	0.14%	0	0.00%	-337	-4.30%	7,836
Taney	1,497	31.96%	3,167	67.61%	8	0.17%	10	0.21%	2	0.04%	-1,670	-35.65%	4,684
Texas	4,497	48.67%	4,730	51.20%	8	0.09%	4	0.04%	0	0.00%	-233	-2.52%	9,239
Vernon	6,271	53.44%	5,443	46.38%	10	0.09%	10	0.09%	1	0.01%	828	7.06%	11,735
Warren	914	21.04%	3,403	78.34%	19	0.44%	6	0.14%	2	0.05%	-2,489	-57.30%	4,344
Washington	2,881	42.96%	3,817	56.92%	4	0.06%	1	0.01%	3	0.04%	-936	-13.96%	6,706
Wayne	2,991	52.12%	2,735	47.66%	2	0.03%	10	0.17%	1	0.02%	256	4.46%	5,739
Webster	3,518	42.12%	4,818	57.69%	10	0.12%	6	0.07%	0	0.00%	-1,300	-15.57%	8,352
Worth	1,702	48.45%	1,807	51.44%	2	0.06%	2	0.06%	0	0.00%	-105	-2.99%	3,513
Wright	2,727	34.77%	5,096	64.98%	11	0.14%	8	0.10%	1	0.01%	-2,369	-30.21%	7,843
Totals	958,476	52.26%	871,009	47.49%	2,226	0.12%	1,809	0.10%	209	0.01%	87,467	4.77%	1,833,988

==== Counties that flipped from Democratic to Republican ====
- Adair
- Atchison
- Barton
- Bates
- Cape Girardeau
- Clark
- Daviess
- Henry
- Jasper
- Johnson
- Livingston
- Madison
- McDonald
- Nodaway
- Osage
- Newton
- Pettis
- St. Charles
- St. Francois
- Ste. Genevieve
- St. Louis
- Washington
- Texas
- Worth

== See also ==
- United States presidential elections in Missouri
