= Worth, Missouri =

Village in Worth County, Missouri, United States

- Village
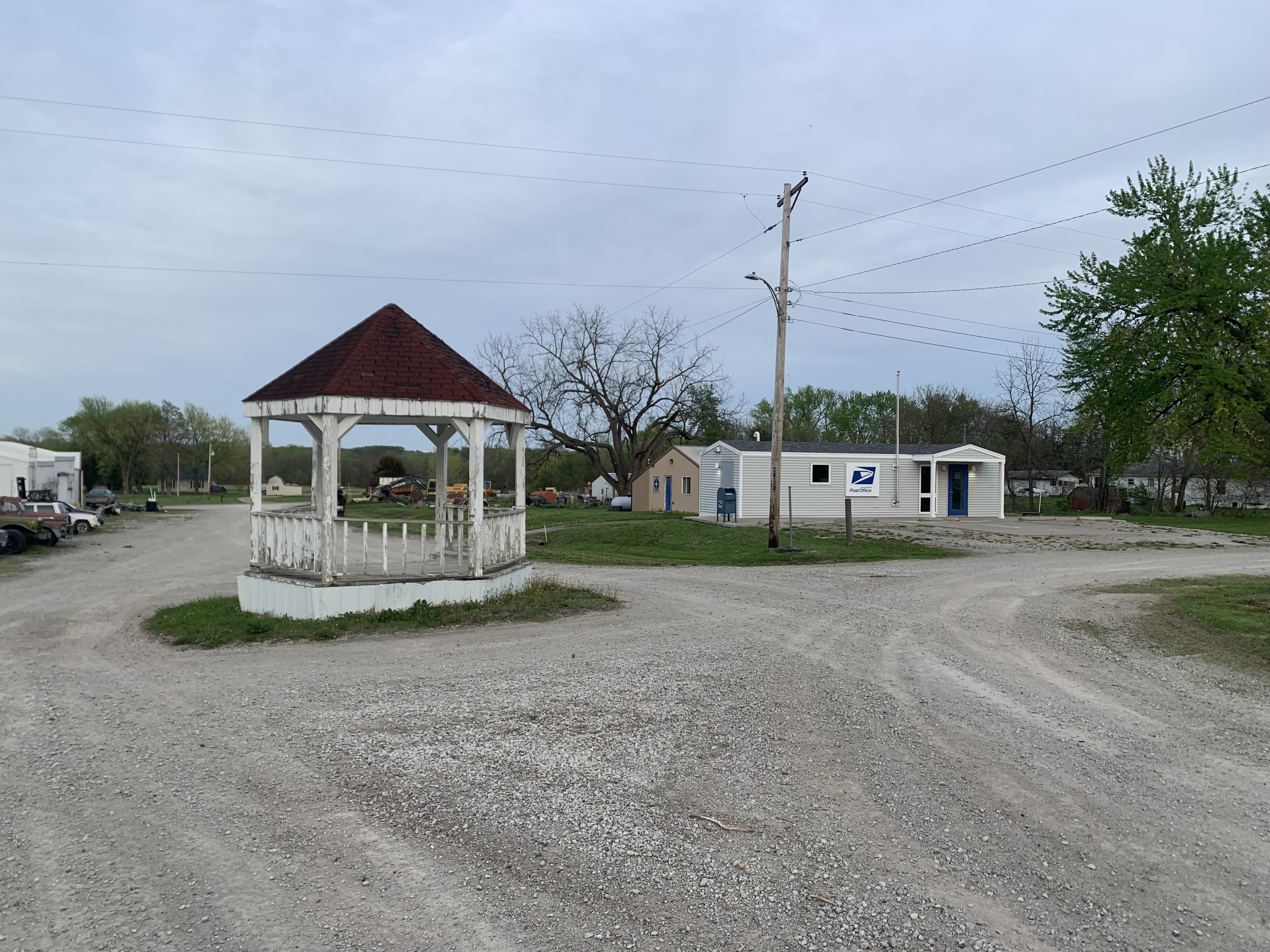
- Main Street Gazebo and Post Office

- Location of Worth, Missouri
- Coordinates: 40°24′16″N 94°26′47″W
- Country: United States
- State: Missouri
- County: Worth
- Township: Worth

Area
  - Total: 0.25 sq mi (0.65 km^{2})
  - Land: 0.25 sq mi (0.65 km^{2})
  - Water: 0 sq mi (0.00 km^{2})
- Elevation: 945 ft (288 m)

Population (2020)
  - Total: 65
  - Density: 257/sq mi (99.4/km^{2})
- Time zone: UTC-6 (Central (CST))
  - Summer (DST): UTC-5 (CDT)
- ZIP code: 64499
- Area code: 660
- FIPS code: 29-81070
- GNIS feature ID: 2399743

Worth is a village in Worth County, Missouri, United States. The population was 65 at the 2020 census.

== History ==
A post office called Worth has been in operation since 1872. The community takes its name from Worth County.

On April 29, 1947, at 3:25 PM, the F4 Worth Tornado of 1947 hit the community, killing 14 and destroying virtually every building.

== Geography ==
Worth is located on the west bank of the Middle Fork Grand River approximately five miles south of Grant City.

Worth is identified by the gazebo located in middle of the road at the intersection of Main and Washington. There is a sign to commemorate the tornado on the East side of town. Worth is also home to WoCo Moto, which is located on Main St. next to the gazebo.

According to the United States Census Bureau, the village has a total area of 0.25 square miles (0.65 km^{2}), all land.

== Demographics ==
Historical population
| Census | Pop. | Note | %± |
|---|---|---|---|
| 1920 | 201 | | — |
| 1930 | 241 | | 19.9% |
| 1940 | 115 | | −52.3% |
| 1950 | 141 | | 22.6% |
| 1960 | 135 | | −4.3% |
| 1970 | 113 | | −16.3% |
| 1980 | 137 | | 21.2% |
| 1990 | 103 | | −24.8% |
| 2000 | 94 | | −8.7% |
| 2010 | 63 | | −33.0% |
| 2020 | 65 | | 3.2% |
U.S. Decennial Census

=== 2010 census ===
As of the census of 2010, there were 63 people, 23 households, and 15 families residing in the village. The population density was 252.0 inhabitants per square mile (97.3/km^{2}). There were 41 housing units at an average density of 164.0 per square mile (63.3/km^{2}). The racial makeup of the village was 85.7% White, 7.9% African American, and 6.3% Native American.

There were 23 households, of which 39.1% had children under the age of 18 living with them, 52.2% were married couples living together, 13.0% had a female householder with no husband present, and 34.8% were non-families. 13.0% of all households were made up of individuals, and 13% had someone living alone who was 65 years of age or older. The average household size was 2.74 and the average family size was 3.27.

The median age in the village was 40.5 years. 30.2% of residents were under the age of 18; 4.7% were between the ages of 18 and 24; 20.6% were from 25 to 44; 34.8% were from 45 to 64; and 9.5% were 65 years of age or older. The gender makeup of the village was 52.4% male and 47.6% female.

=== 2000 census ===
As of the census of 2000, there were 94 people, 39 households, and 26 families residing in the town. The population density was 378.8 inhabitants per square mile (146.3/km^{2}). There were 50 housing units at an average density of 201.5 per square mile (77.8/km^{2}). The racial makeup of the town was 98.94% White and 1.06% Native American.

There were 39 households, out of which 33.3% had children under the age of 18 living with them, 53.8% were married couples living together, 10.3% had a female householder with no husband present, and 33.3% were non-families. 23.1% of all households were made up of individuals, and 17.9% had someone living alone who was 65 years of age or older. The average household size was 2.41 and the average family size was 2.88.

In the town the population was spread out, with 22.3% under the age of 18, 14.9% from 18 to 24, 25.5% from 25 to 44, 18.1% from 45 to 64, and 19.1% who were 65 years of age or older. The median age was 36 years. For every 100 females, there were 118.6 males. For every 100 females age 18 and over, there were 121.2 males.

The median income for a household in the town was $28,750, and the median income for a family was $30,000. Males had a median income of $22,250 versus $16,875 for females. The per capita income for the town was $11,261. There were 26.7% of families and 28.4% of the population living below the poverty line, including 43.5% of under eighteens and 22.2% of those over 64.

== See also ==
- List of municipalities in Missouri
