= Fletchall Township, Worth County, Missouri =

Township in Worth County, Missouri, U.S.

Fletchall Township
- Township
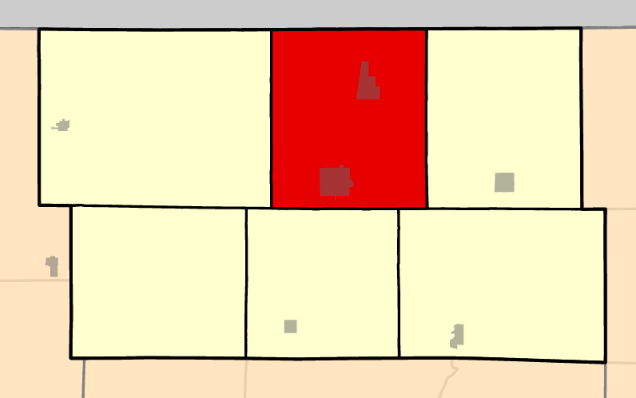
- Coordinates: 40°30′59″N 94°24′08″W
- Country: United States
- State: Missouri
- County: Worth

Area
  - Total: 41.81 sq mi (108.3 km^{2})
  - Land: 41.79 sq mi (108.2 km^{2})
  - Water: 0.02 sq mi (0.052 km^{2}) 0.05%
- Elevation: 1,096 ft (334 m)

Population (2020)
  - Total: 1,032
  - Density: 24.7/sq mi (9.5/km^{2})
- FIPS code: 29-22724616
- GNIS feature ID: 767540

Fletchall Township is a township in Worth County, Missouri, United States. At the 2020 census, its population was 1032. The county seat Grant City lies in its south and the Grand River runs through its eastern portion. It contains 42 sections with 6 being fractional.

Fletchall Township has the name of John Fletchall, a pioneer citizen.

== Transportation ==
The following highways travel through the township:

- U.S. Route 169
- Route 46
- Route E
- Route J
- Route K
- Route PP
- Route Y
- Route Z

== Gallery ==
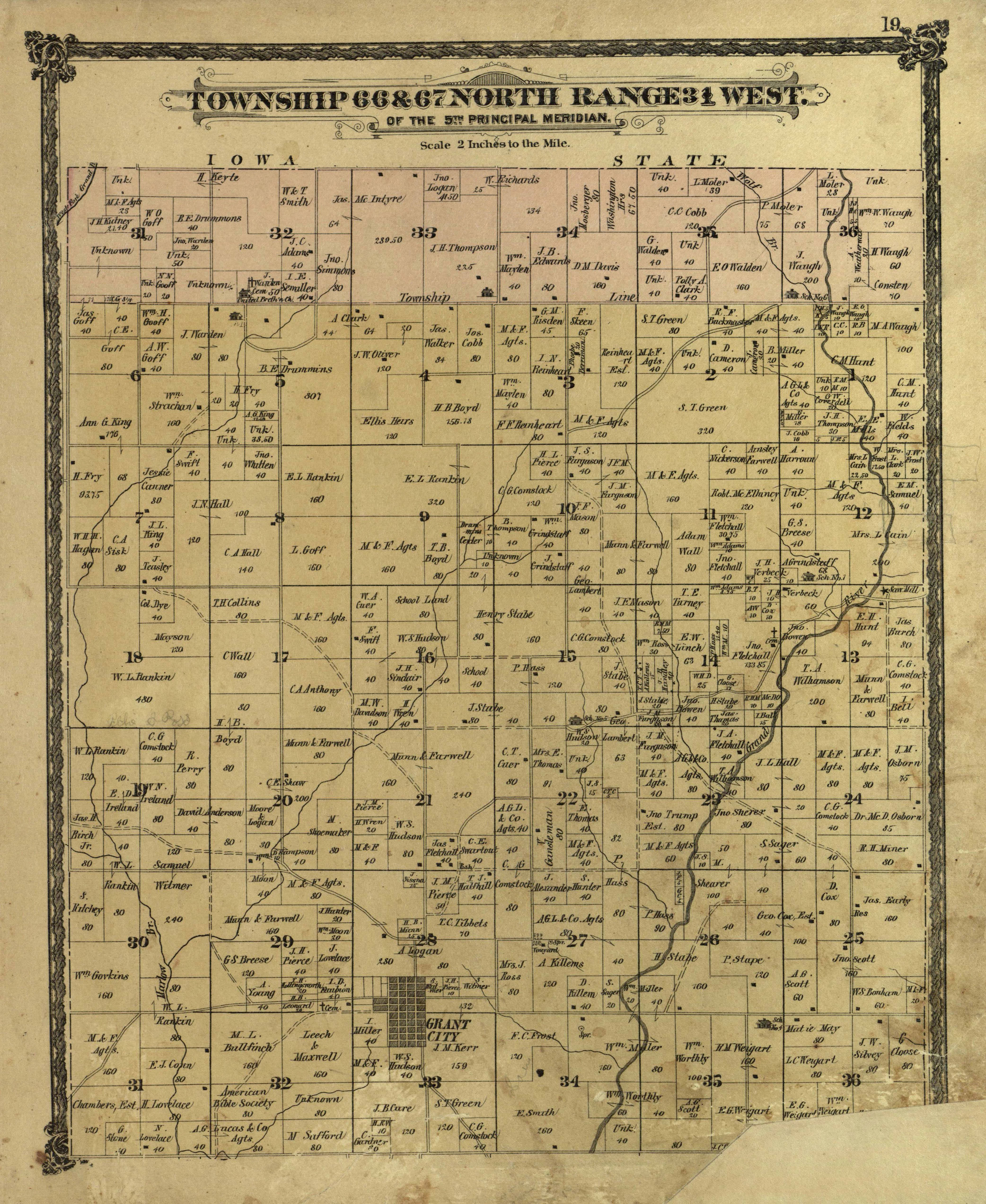
Township 66 and 67 North; Range 31 West of the 5th Principal Meridian
