= Allen Township, Worth County, Missouri =

Township in Worth County, Missouri, U.S.

Allen Township
- Township
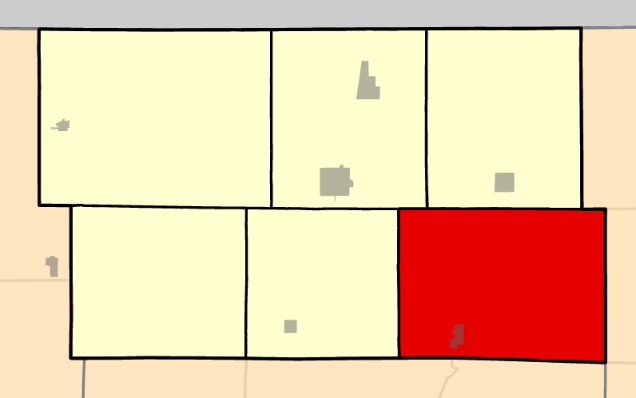
- Coordinates: 40°25′42″N 94°17′25″W
- Country: United States
- State: Missouri
- County: Worth
- Elevation: 1,040 ft (320 m)

Population (2020)
  - Total: 120
  - Density: 2.6/sq mi (1.0/km^{2})
- FIPS code: 29-22700694
- GNIS feature ID: 767539

Allen Township is a township in Worth County, Missouri, United States. At the 2020 census, its population was 120. The village of Denver lies in its southwest on the east bank of the East Fork Grand River. It contains 48 sections with 8 being fractional.

Allen Township has the name of Aaron M. Allen, a pioneer citizen who moved from Illinois in 1843.

== Transportation ==
The following highways travel through the township:

- Route AA
- Route C
- Route M
- Route N

== Gallery ==
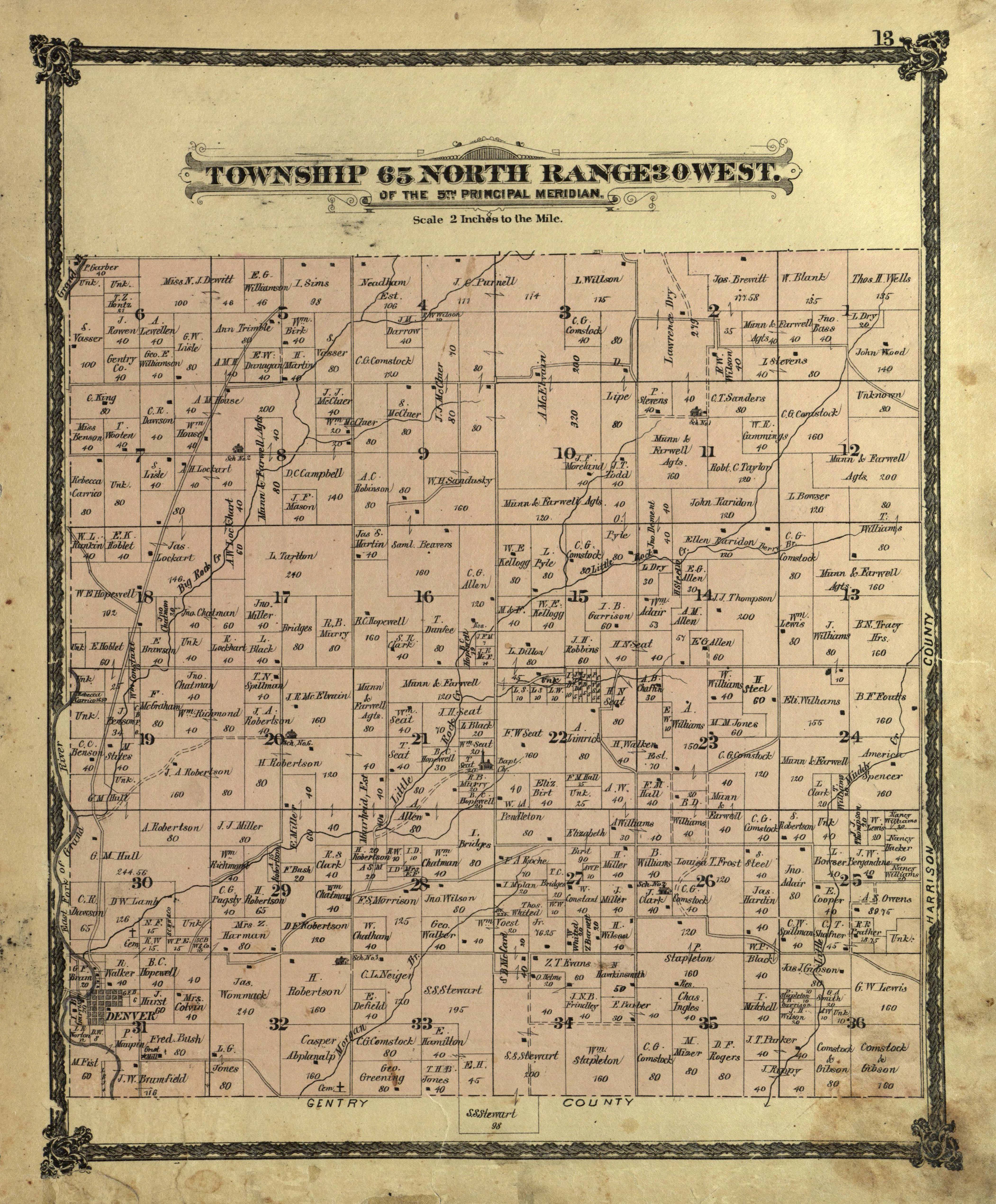
Township 65 North, Range 30 West of the 5th Principal Meridian

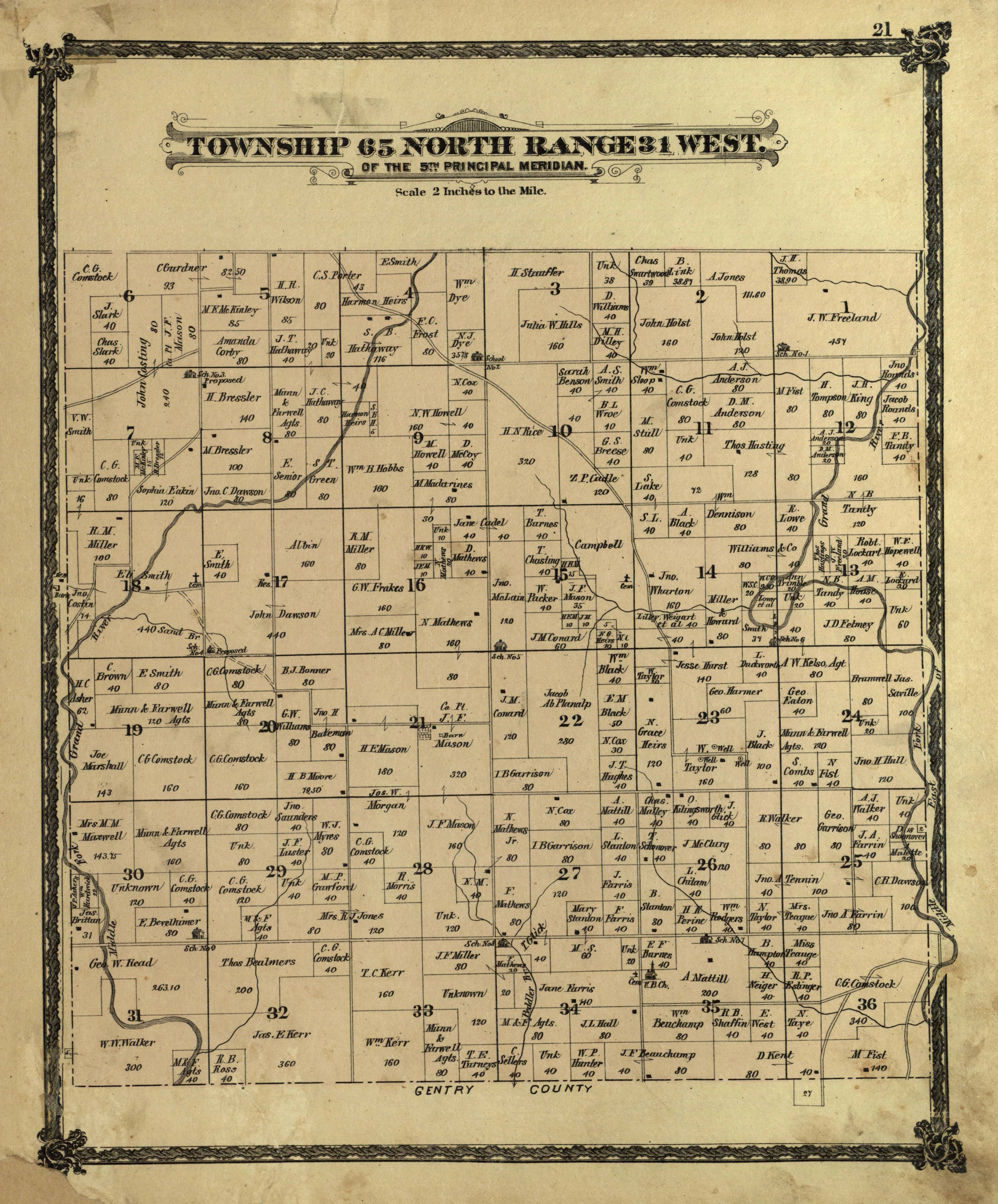
Township 65 North, Range 31 West of the 5th Principal Meridian
