= Green Township =

Green Township may refer to:

== Indiana ==
- Green Township, Grant County, Indiana
- Green Township, Hancock County, Indiana
- Green Township, Madison County, Indiana
- Green Township, Marshall County, Indiana
- Green Township, Morgan County, Indiana
- Green Township, Noble County, Indiana
- Green Township, Randolph County, Indiana
- Green Township, Wayne County, Indiana

== Iowa ==
- Green Township, Fremont County, Iowa
- Green Township, Wapello County, Iowa

== Kansas ==
- Green Township, Pottawatomie County, Kansas, in Pottawatomie County, Kansas

== Michigan ==
- Green Township, Alpena County, Michigan
- Green Charter Township, Michigan, in Mecosta County

== Missouri ==
- Green Township, Hickory County, Missouri
- Green Township, Lawrence County, Missouri
- Green Township, Livingston County, Missouri
- Green Township, Nodaway County, Missouri
- Green Township, Platte County, Missouri

== Nebraska ==
- Green Township, Saunders County, Nebraska

== New Jersey ==
- Green Township, New Jersey

== North Dakota ==
- Green Township, Barnes County, North Dakota

== Ohio ==
- Green Township, Adams County, Ohio
- Green Township, Ashland County, Ohio
- Green Township, Brown County, Ohio
- Green Township, Clark County, Ohio
- Green Township, Clinton County, Ohio
- Green Township, Fayette County, Ohio
- Green Township, Gallia County, Ohio
- Green Township, Hamilton County, Ohio
- Green Township, Harrison County, Ohio
- Green Township, Hocking County, Ohio
- Green Township, Mahoning County, Ohio
- Green Township, Monroe County, Ohio
- Green Township, Ross County, Ohio
- Green Township, Scioto County, Ohio
- Green Township, Shelby County, Ohio
- Green Township, Summit County, Ohio, now the city of Green
- Green Township, Wayne County, Ohio

== Pennsylvania ==
- Green Township, Forest County, Pennsylvania
- Green Township, Indiana County, Pennsylvania

== See also ==
- Greene Township (disambiguation)
