= Pennsylvania Route 240 =

State highway in Pennsylvania, US

Pennsylvania Route 240

Route information
- Maintained by PennDOT
- Length: 8.504 mi (13.686 km)
- Existed: 1966–present

Major junctions
- West end: PA 286 in Commodore
- East end: US 219 near Cherry Tree

Location
- Country: United States
- State: Pennsylvania
- Counties: Indiana, Cambria

Highway system
- Pennsylvania State Route System; Interstate; US; State; Scenic; Legislative
| ← PA 239 | → PA 241 |

Pennsylvania Route 240 (PA 240) is an 8.5-mile-long (13.7 km) state highway located in Indiana and Cambria counties in Pennsylvania. The western terminus is at PA 286 in Commodore. The eastern terminus is at U.S. Route 219 (US 219) near Cherry Tree.

== Route description ==
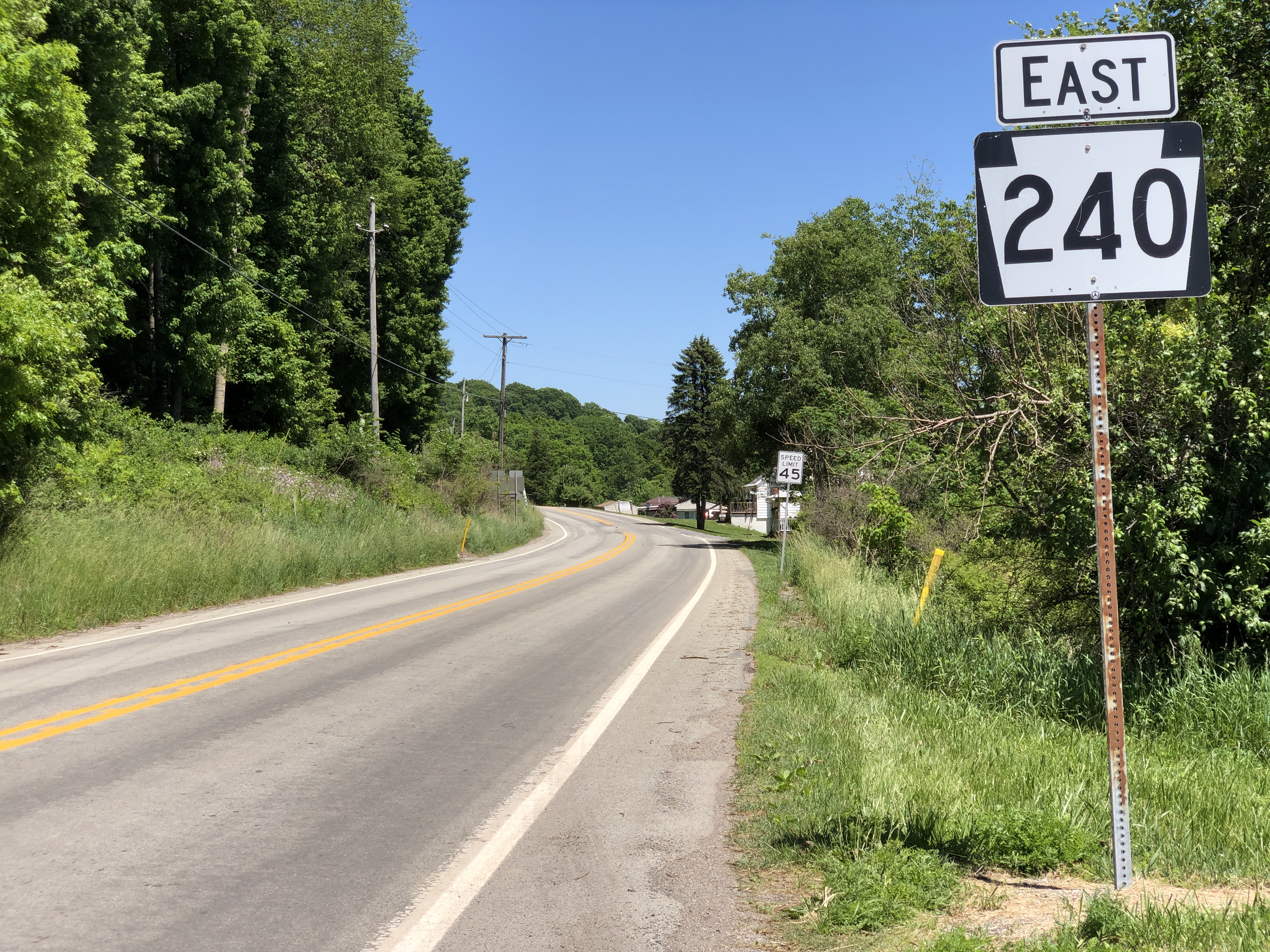
PA 240 eastbound past PA 580 in Green Township

PA 240 begins at an intersection with PA 286 in Green Township, Indiana County, heading southeast on a two-lane undivided road. The route heads through wooded areas and crosses a R.J. Corman Railroad line at-grade, curving east into a mix of farmland and woodland with some homes. The road heads through open farmland and turns southeast, passing through the residential community of Cookport. PA 240 turns northeast into more rural areas of farms and woods with some residences, heading east again. Farther east, the route comes to an intersection with PA 580 in the community of Uniontown. Past this intersection, the road heads into wooded areas with some homes. The route enters Susquehanna Township in Cambria County and becomes Peg Run Road, turning northeast and east through more forested areas of residences. PA 240 crosses the West Branch Susquehanna River and comes to its eastern terminus at an intersection with US 219.

== Major intersections ==
| County | Location | mi | km | Destinations | Notes |
|---|---|---|---|---|---|
| Indiana | Green Township | 0.000 | 0.000 | PA 286 – Clymer, Mahaffey | Western terminus |
| Indiana | Green Township | 6.707 | 10.794 | PA 580 – Cherry Tree, Pine Flats | |
| Cambria | Susquehanna Township | 8.504 | 13.686 | US 219 (Shawna Road) – DuBois, Northern Cambria | Eastern terminus |
1.000 mi = 1.609 km; 1.000 km = 0.621 mi
