= Green Township, Indiana =

Green Township is the name of eight townships in the U.S. state of Indiana:

- Green Township, Grant County, Indiana
- Green Township, Hancock County, Indiana
- Green Township, Madison County, Indiana
- Green Township, Marshall County, Indiana
- Green Township, Morgan County, Indiana
- Green Township, Noble County, Indiana
- Green Township, Randolph County, Indiana
- Green Township, Wayne County, Indiana

See also:

- Greene Township, Indiana (disambiguation)
- Green Township (disambiguation)
