= Greene Township, Illinois =

Greene Township may refer to one of the following places in the State of Illinois:

- Greene Township, Mercer County, Illinois
- Greene Township, Woodford County, Illinois

See also

- Greene Township (disambiguation)
