= Susquehanna Township, Cambria County, Pennsylvania =

Township in Pennsylvania, US

Coordinates: 40°40′39″N 78°45′52″W

- Township
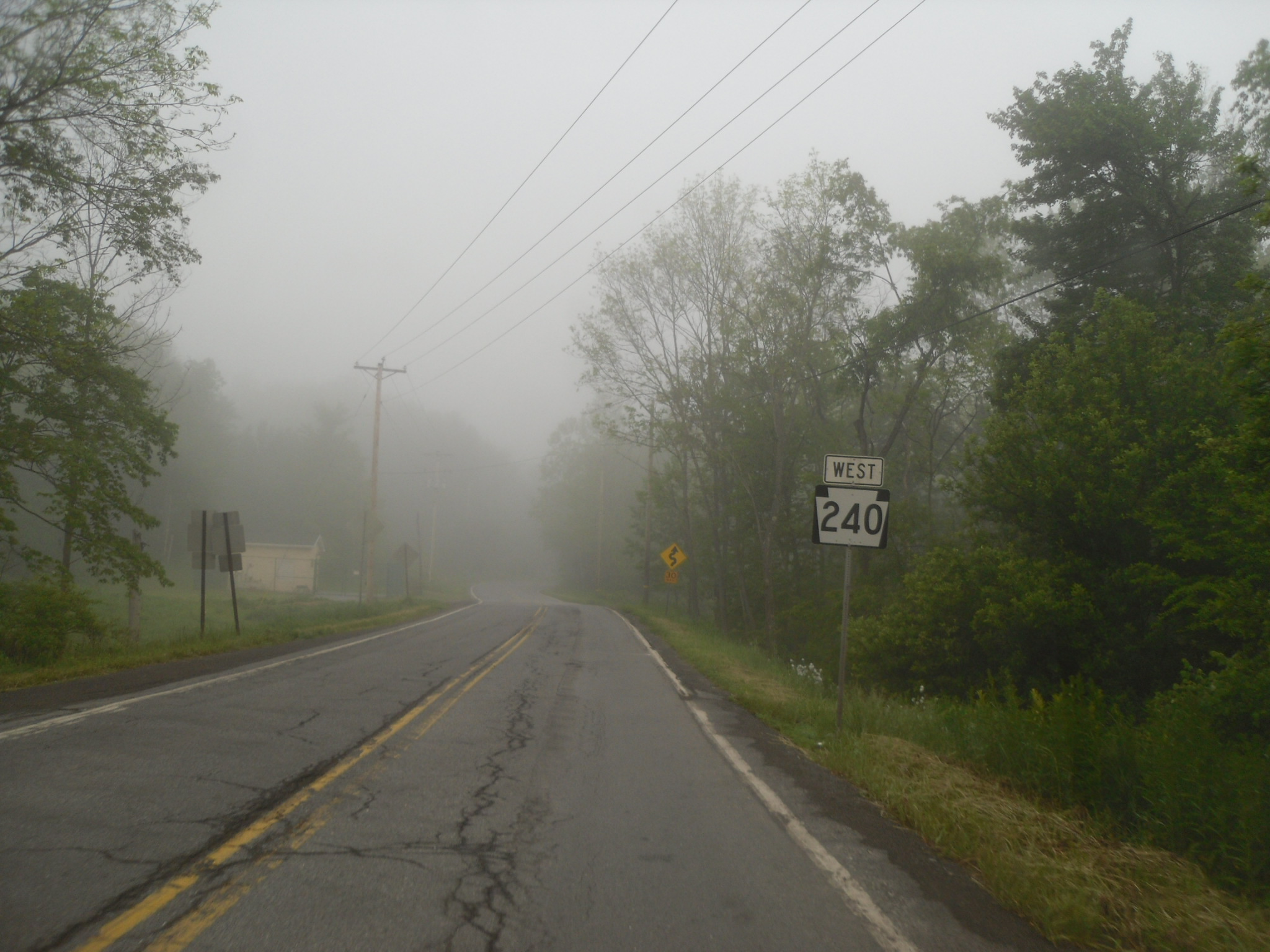
- Westbound PA 240 in Susquehanna Township

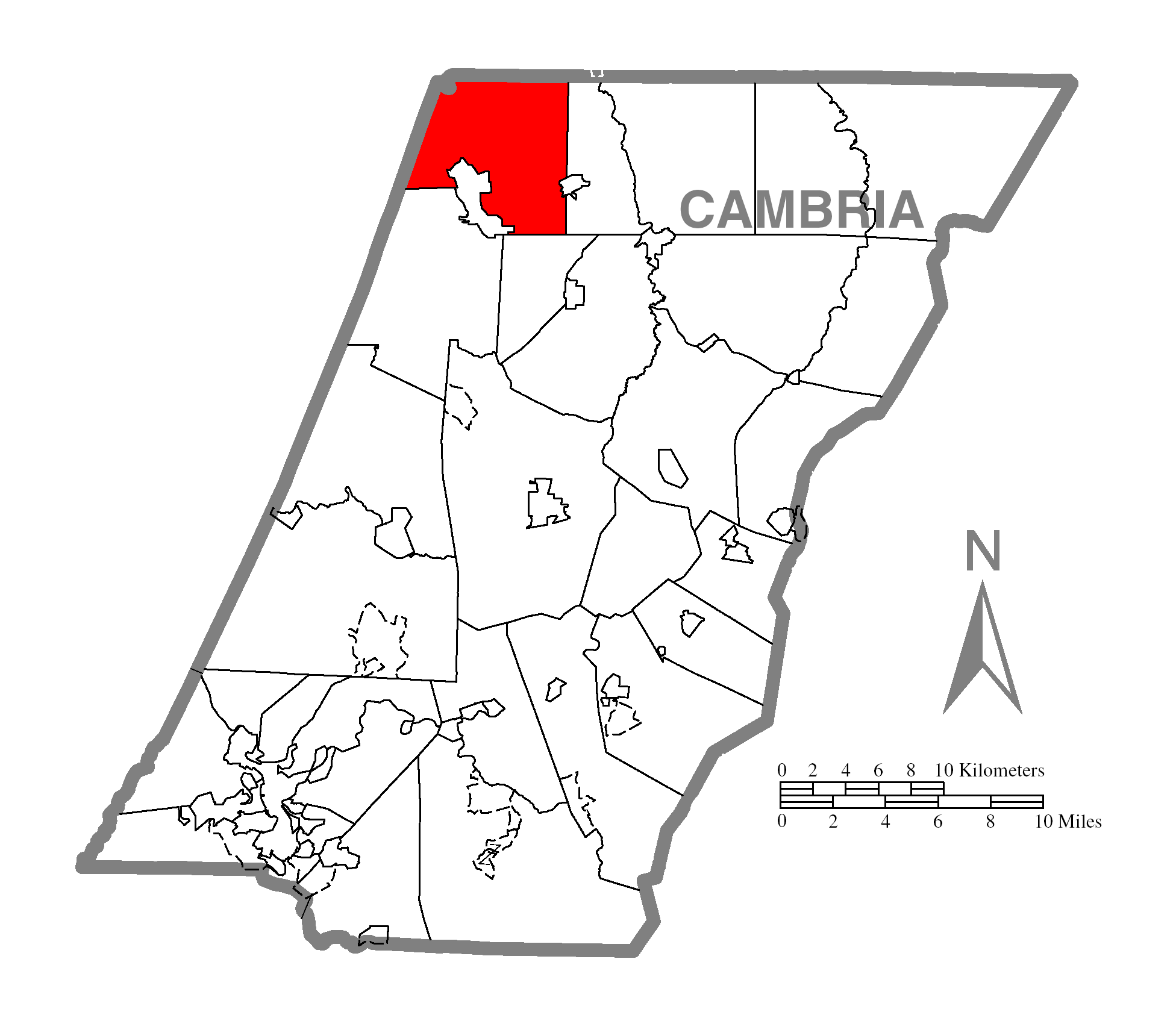
- Map of Cambria County, Pennsylvania highlighting Susquehanna Township

- Map of Cambria County, Pennsylvania
- Country: United States
- State: Pennsylvania
- County: Cambria
- Incorporated: 1825

Area
  - Total: 28.05 sq mi (72.64 km^{2})
  - Land: 28.04 sq mi (72.63 km^{2})
  - Water: 0.0039 sq mi (0.01 km^{2})

Population (2010)
  - Total: 2,007
  - Estimate (2016): 1,891
  - Density: 67.4/sq mi (26.04/km^{2})
- Time zone: UTC-5 (Eastern (EST))
  - Summer (DST): UTC-4 (EDT)
- Area code: 814
- FIPS code: 42-021-75520
- Website: susquehannacambriapa.com

Susquehanna Township is a township in Cambria County, Pennsylvania, United States. The population was 2,007 at the 2010 census. It is part of the Johnstown, Pennsylvania Metropolitan Statistical Area.

== History ==
Susquehanna Township was incorporated on January 6, 1825, being formed from Allegheny and Cambria Townships. In addition to agriculture, the ready local supply of lumber attracted people to the area in the early 19th century. Much of this was transported down the West Branch Susquehanna River to lumber towns such as Williamsport. In the late 19th century, the arrival of the railroad opened up the area to coal mining. The subsequent mining boom created many jobs, attracting a large number of people to settle in the area of Susquehanna Township, many of whom remained with their families after the boom had ended.

== Geography ==
The township is located in the northwestern corner of Cambria County, bordered by Clearfield County to the north and Indiana County to the west. The West Branch Susquehanna River flows northward through the western part of the township, having risen less than 10 miles (16 km) to the south near Carrolltown. The township is bordered by three boroughs: Northern Cambria is in the south, Hastings is on the eastern border, and Cherry Tree is at the township's northwest corner. U.S. Route 219 passes through the township, leading south 17 miles (27 km) to Ebensburg, the Cambria County seat, and north 44 miles (71 km) to DuBois.

According to the United States Census Bureau, the township has a total area of 28.0 square miles (72.6 km^{2}), all of it land.

== Communities ==
=== Unincorporated communities ===
- Allport
- Byrnesville - named after Thomas J. Byrnes (1852–1934)
- Cymbria - Welsh for Cambria
- Emeigh
- Emeigh Run
- Garmantown - formerly known as Garman and originally named Garman's Mills (grist & saw). It had one of the first of two US Post Offices in northern Cambria County. Garman was named after Peter Garman (1822–1909). His house was a stop on the Underground Railroad ("Women of Cambria County, Their Work - Their History - Their Contributions" by AAUW Johnstown, PA, 1988, pp 53–54.) The region was a source of tall white pine trees which were logged and shipped to the United Kingdom to be used for masts of ships ("My Partner, The River: The White Pine Story on the Susquehanna" by R. Dudley Tonkin (University of Pittsburgh Press, 1958).
- Greenwich
- Plattsville - originally called Platts which had one of the first of two US Post Offices in northern Cambria County. It is located on The Kittanning Path, a Native American trail which was also used by colonial fur traders.
- Shazen - origin is Arabic and means one who is highly regarded and respected. Known locally as Bugtown.

== Demographics ==
Historical population
Census	Pop.	Note	%±
2000	2,198		—
2010	2,007		−8.7%
2016 (est.)	1,891		−5.8%
U.S. Decennial Census

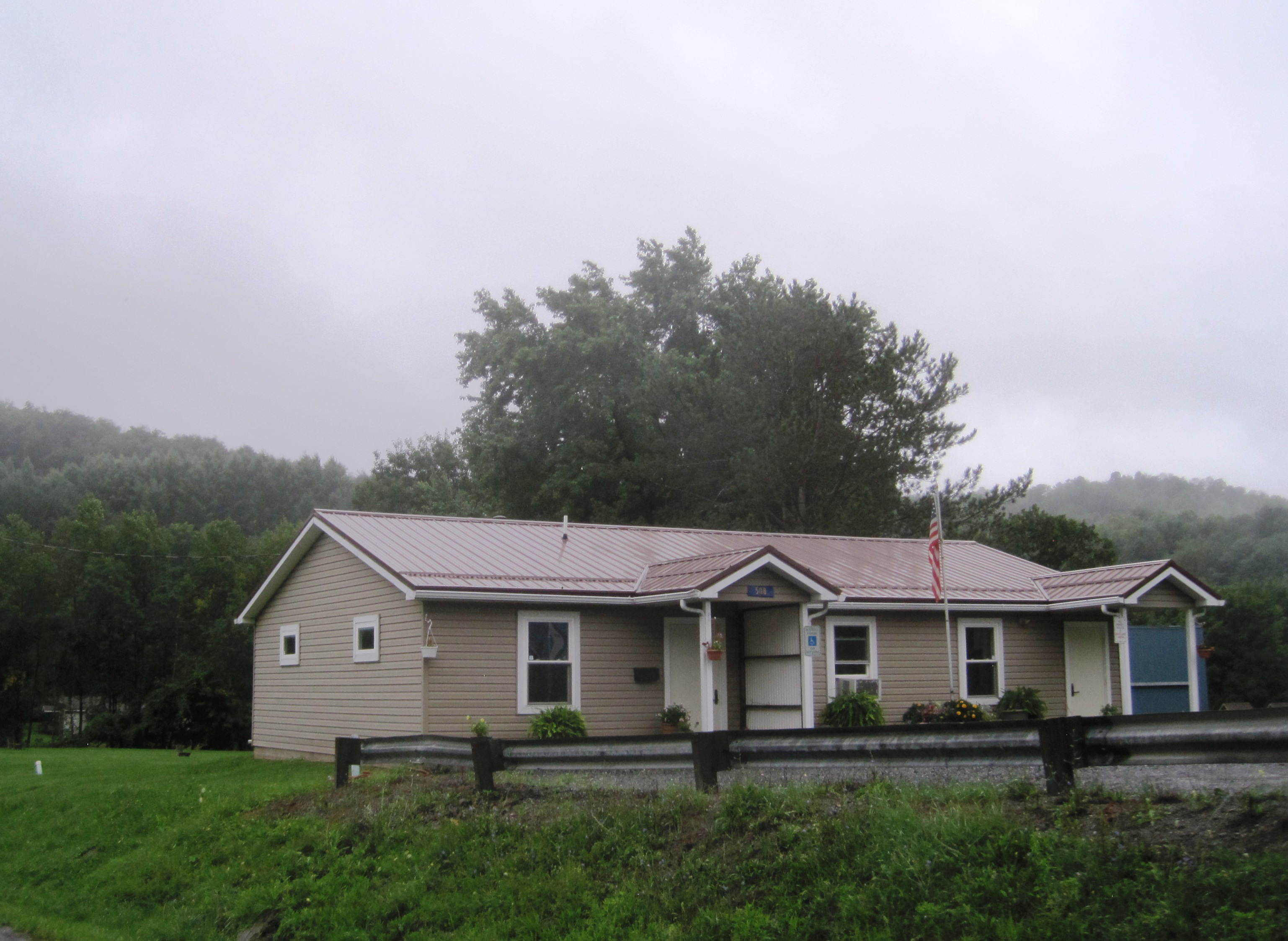
Susquehanna Town Hall

As of the census of 2000, there were 2,198 people, 829 households, and 615 families residing in the township. The population density was 79.4 inhabitants per square mile (30.7/km^{2}). There were 898 housing units at an average density of 32.4 per square mile (12.5/km^{2}). The racial makeup of the township was 99.59% White, 0.05% African American, 0.09% Native American, 0.05% Asian, 0.05% from other races, and 0.18% from two or more races. Hispanic or Latino of any race were 0.45% of the population.

There were 829 households, out of which 29.9% had children under the age of 18 living with them, 60.3% were married couples living together, 7.4% had a female householder with no husband present, and 25.7% were non-families. 22.6% of all households were made up of individuals, and 14.1% had someone living alone who was 65 years of age or older. The average household size was 2.62 and the average family size was 3.07.

In the township the population was spread out, with 22.9% under the age of 18, 7.9% from 18 to 24, 26.9% from 25 to 44, 25.8% from 45 to 64, and 16.5% who were 65 years of age or older. The median age was 40 years. For every 100 females, there were 101.8 males. For every 100 females age 18 and over, there were 100.1 males.

The median income for a household in the township was $26,983, and the median income for a family was $35,099. Males had a median income of $30,026 versus $19,861 for females. The per capita income for the township was $12,878. About 7.3% of families and 9.7% of the population were below the poverty line, including 9.2% of those under age 18 and 11.7% of those age 65 or over.
