= Greene Township, Indiana =

Greene Township is the name of three townships in the U.S. state of Indiana:

- Greene Township, Jay County, Indiana
- Greene Township, Parke County, Indiana
- Greene Township, St. Joseph County, Indiana

See also:

- Green Township, Indiana (disambiguation)
- Greene Township (disambiguation)
