= Pennsylvania Route 580 =

State highway in Indiana County, Pennsylvania, US

Pennsylvania Route 580

Route information
- Maintained by PennDOT
- Length: 10.141 mi (16.320 km)
- Existed: May 27, 1935–present

Major junctions
- South end: PA 403 in Cherryhill Township
- PA 240 in Green Township
- North end: US 219 in Cherry Tree

Location
- Country: United States
- State: Pennsylvania
- Counties: Indiana

Highway system
- Pennsylvania State Route System; Interstate; US; State; Scenic; Legislative
← I-579	→ PA 581

Pennsylvania Route 580 (PA 580) is a 10.1-mile-long (16.3 km) state highway located in Indiana County, Pennsylvania. The southern terminus is at PA 403 in Cherryhill Township. The northern terminus is at US 219 in Cherry Tree.

== Route description ==
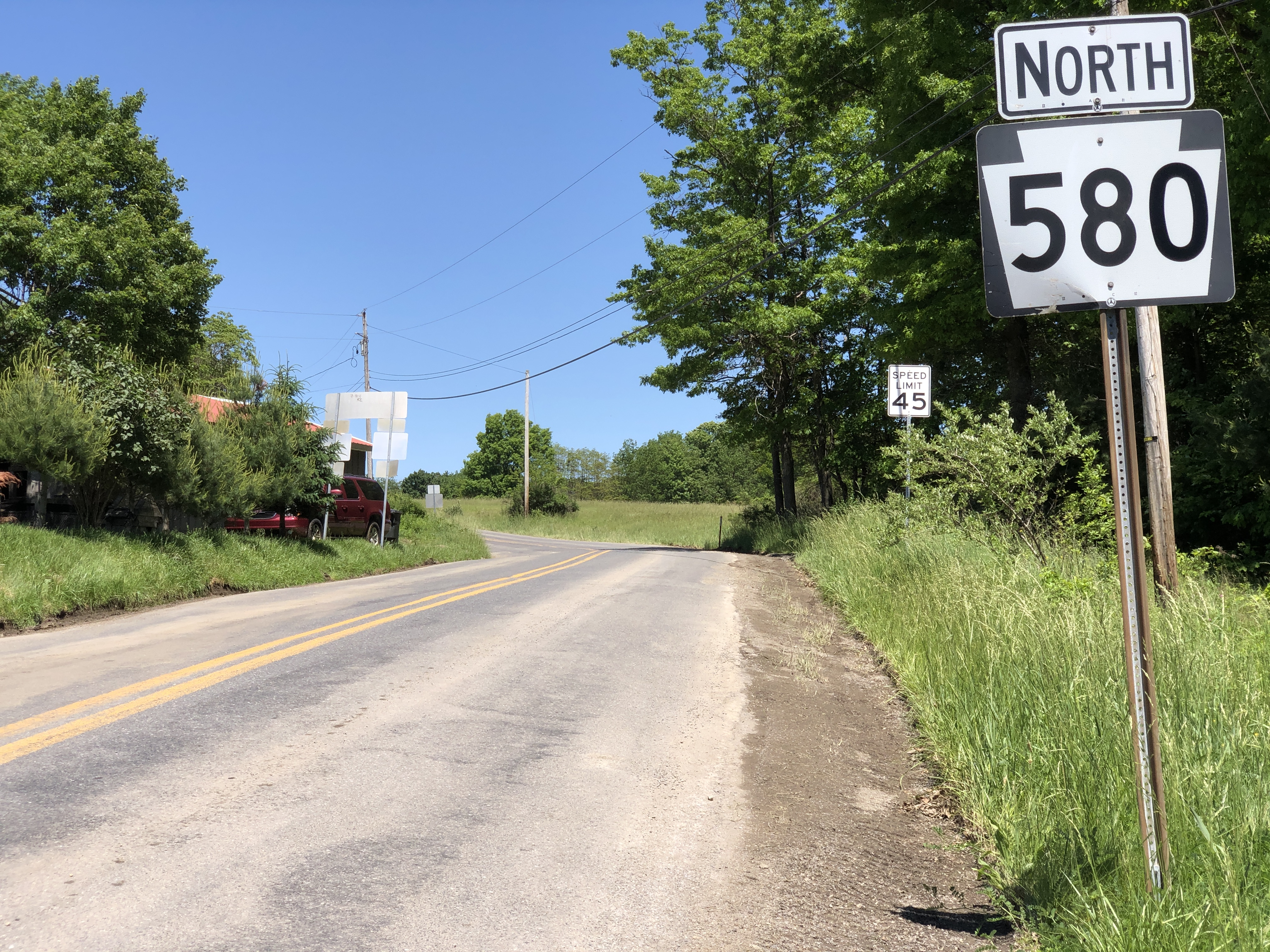
PA 580 northbound past PA 240 in Green Township

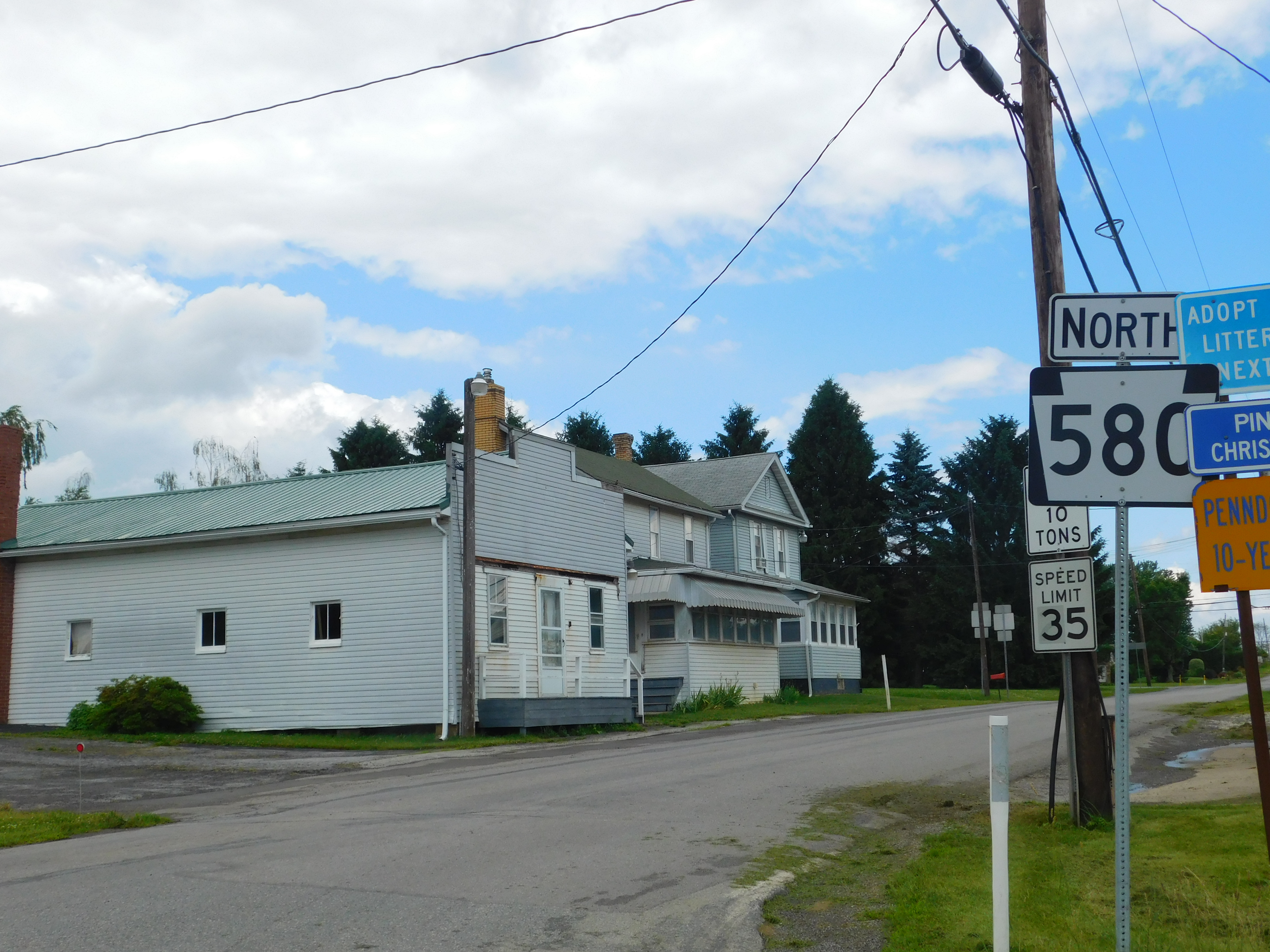
PA 580 northbound in Kenwood

PA 580 begins at an intersection with PA 403 in the community of Kenwood in Cherryhill Township, heading east-northeast on a two-lane undivided road. The route passes through agricultural areas with some homes, passing through Manver. The road continues into Green Township and runs through a mix of farmland and woodland with a few residences, serving the community of Pine Flats. Farther northeast, PA 580 heads into more forested areas with some fields and homes, passing through Spruce and curving to the north-northeast. The route crosses PA 240 in Uniontown and continues through more forests. The road turns east and crosses a R.J. Corman Railroad line, heading into the borough of Cherry Tree. Here, PA 580 becomes Maple Street and enters residential areas, turning north onto Front Street before turning east onto Cherry Street. The route crosses another R.J. Corman Railroad line and the West Branch Susquehanna River, passing more homes and businesses prior to ending at US 219.

== Major intersections ==
The entire route is in Indiana County.

Location	mi	km	Destinations	Notes
Cherryhill Township	0.000	0.000	PA 403	Southern terminus
Green Township	7.779	12.519	PA 240 – Cookport, Northern Cambria	
Cherry Tree	10.141	16.320	US 219 (Main Street) – Burnside, Northern Cambria	Northern terminus
1.000 mi = 1.609 km; 1.000 km = 0.621 mi
