= Argos, Indiana =

Town in Marshall county, Indiana

- Town
- Town of Argos
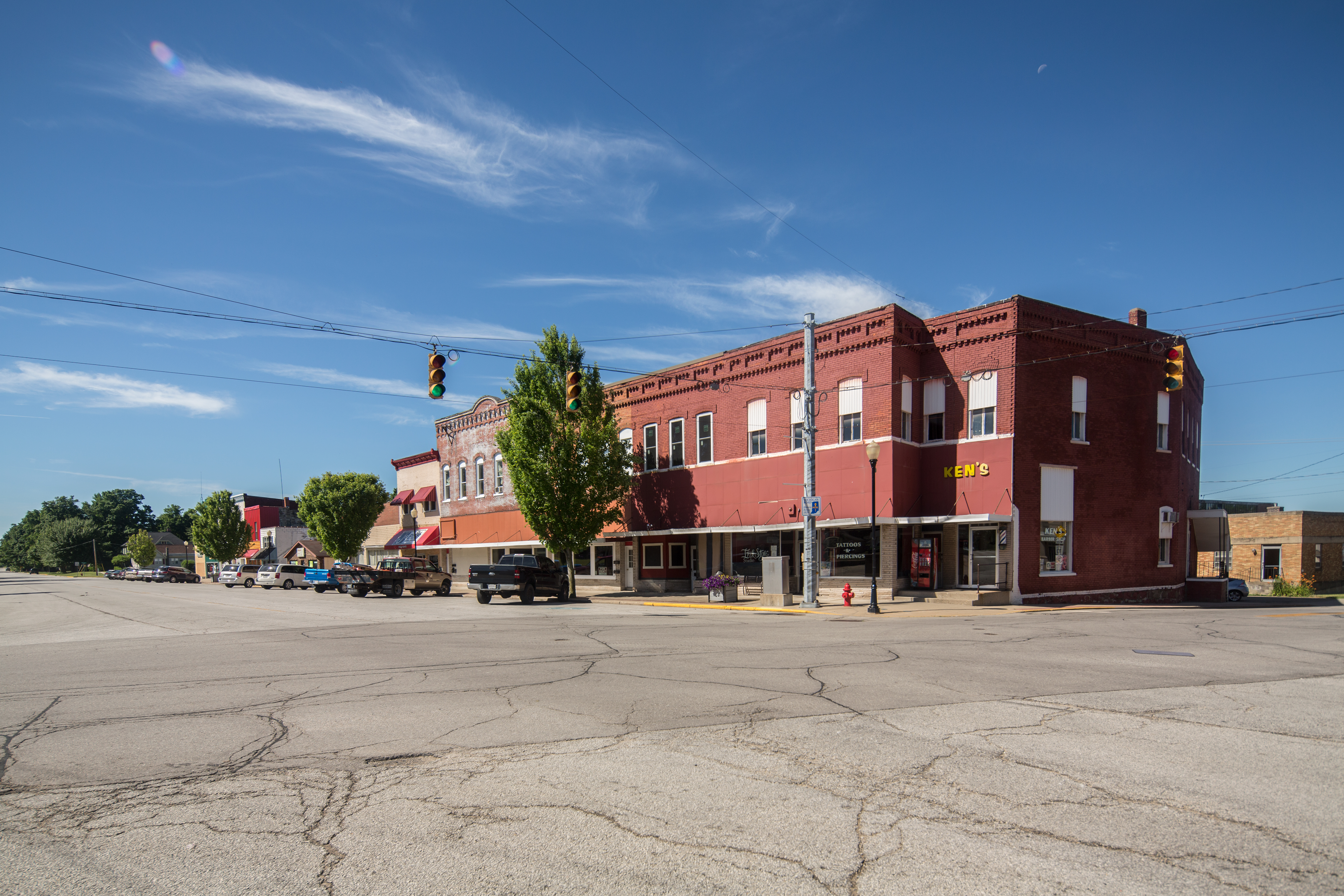

- Seal Logo

- Location of Argos in Marshall County, Indiana.
- Coordinates: 41°14′16″N 86°14′46″W
- Country: United States
- State: Indiana
- County: Marshall
- Townships: Green, Walnut
- Incorporated: 1869
- Founder: Sidney Williams

Area
  - Total: 1.30 sq mi (3.36 km^{2})
  - Land: 1.29 sq mi (3.33 km^{2})
  - Water: 0.012 sq mi (0.03 km^{2})
- Elevation: 728 ft (222 m)

Population (2020)
  - Total: 1,777
  - Density: 1,382.2/sq mi (533.68/km^{2})
- Time zone: UTC−5 (EST)
  - Summer (DST): UTC−5 (EST)
- ZIP code: 46501
- Area code: 574
- FIPS code: 18-02044
- GNIS ID: 430243
- Website: townofargos.com

Argos (/ˈɑːrɡəs/) is a town in Green and Walnut townships, Marshall County, Indiana, United States. The population was 1,777 at the 2020 census.

== History ==
In 1833, Sidney Williams arrived in the area which is now Marshall County and purchased 600 acres (2.4 km^{2}) of land on the present day site of Argos. Mr. Williams built a tavern, an inn, and helped build a section of Michigan Road. Mr. Williams sold his land to Clark Bliven, the man who built the courthouse on the Williams's land. This local place of rest was not considered a town until some time later. On January 8, 1851, John Pleak and Marquis L. Smith, laid out the town of Sidney, which is the predecessor to Argos. The town of Sidney was named in honor of Sidney Williams.

In 1854, the post office was removed from Sidney through political manipulations. Schuyler Colfax, the congressman in the district, was asked to name the post office. He had a great interest in Greek history, which led him to name the post office "Argos" after the ancient Greek city made famous in the Iliad of Homer.

On November 6, 1856, the town of Fremont, adjoining the town of Sidney, was laid out by Joseph H. Rhodes. Fremont was named after Col. John C. Fremont, who on November 6, 1856, won the Republican candidate for president.

On May 21, 1859, a meeting was held in the school house for anyone interested in the formation of a new township. The purpose of the meeting was to consolidate Sidney and Fremont, select a name for the township, and appoint a suitable person to be the trustee. The names that were offered up for the town were Argos, Noble, and Richland. Noble was withdrawn. The vote total was Argos 12, Richland 8, and thus Argos became the name for the consolidated towns. The commissioners ordered the Township to be called Walnut Township due to the abundance of walnut trees in the area. John A. Rhodes and Charles Brown were proposed for trustee. Rhodes won by a vote of 18 to 4.

The town of Argos was incorporated in the state law in December 1869.

The Argos Downtown Historic District was listed on the National Register of Historic Places in 2001.

== Geography ==
Argos is located at 41°14′16″N 86°14′46″W (41.237732, -86.245976).

According to the 2010 census, Argos has a total area of 1.17 square miles (3.03 km^{2}), of which 1.16 square miles (3.00 km^{2}) (or 99.15%) is land and 0.01 square miles (0.03 km^{2}) (or 0.85%) is water.

== Demographics ==
Historical population
Census	Pop.	Note	%±
1880	622		—
1890	1,101		77.0%
1900	1,307		18.7%
1910	1,088		−16.8%
1920	1,111		2.1%
1930	1,211		9.0%
1940	1,190		−1.7%
1950	1,284		7.9%
1960	1,329		3.5%
1970	1,393		4.8%
1980	1,547		11.1%
1990	1,642		6.1%
2000	1,613		−1.8%
2010	1,691		4.8%
2020	1,777		5.1%
U.S. Decennial Census

=== 2020 census ===
As of the 2020 census, Argos had a population of 1,777. The median age was 35.5 years. 27.0% of residents were under the age of 18 and 15.0% of residents were 65 years of age or older. For every 100 females there were 99.9 males, and for every 100 females age 18 and over there were 99.8 males age 18 and over.

0.0% of residents lived in urban areas, while 100.0% lived in rural areas.

There were 688 households in Argos, of which 35.5% had children under the age of 18 living in them. Of all households, 43.5% were married-couple households, 19.5% were households with a male householder and no spouse or partner present, and 27.0% were households with a female householder and no spouse or partner present. About 27.5% of all households were made up of individuals and 13.6% had someone living alone who was 65 years of age or older.

There were 744 housing units, of which 7.5% were vacant. The homeowner vacancy rate was 2.1% and the rental vacancy rate was 9.4%.

Racial composition as of the 2020 census
Race	Number	Percent
White	1,642	92.4%
Black or African American	4	0.2%
American Indian and Alaska Native	11	0.6%
Asian	2	0.1%
Native Hawaiian and Other Pacific Islander	0	0.0%
Some other race	31	1.7%
Two or more races	87	4.9%
Hispanic or Latino (of any race)	99	5.6%

=== 2010 census ===
As of the 2010 census, there were 1,691 people, 642 households, and 443 families residing in the town. The population density was 1,457.8 inhabitants per square mile (562.9/km^{2}). There were 724 housing units at an average density of 624.1 per square mile (241.0/km^{2}). The racial makeup of the town was 94.9% White, 0.3% African American, 0.5% Native American, 0.2% Asian, 2.0% from other races, and 2.1% from two or more races. Hispanic or Latino of any race were 4.6% of the population.

There were 642 households, of which 37.1% had children under the age of 18 living with them, 46.4% were married couples living together, 17.3% had a female householder with no husband present, 5.3% had a male householder with no wife present, and 31.0% were non-families. 25.2% of all households were made up of individuals, and 10.4% had someone living alone who was 65 years of age or older. The average household size was 2.63 and the average family size was 3.08.

The median age in the town was 33.1 years. 28.4% of residents were under the age of 18; 9.3% were between the ages of 18 and 24; 26.6% were from 25 to 44; 23.6% were from 45 to 64; and 12% were 65 years of age or older. The gender makeup of the town was 50.2% male and 49.8% female.

=== 2000 census ===
As of the 2000 census, there were 1,613 people, 615 households, and 432 families residing in the town. The population density was 1378.6 people per square mile. There were 669 housing units at an average density of 576.7 per square mile . The racial makeup of the town was 98.57% White, 0.19% African American, 0.06% Native American, 0.12% Asian, 0.43% from other races, and 0.62% from two or more races. Hispanic or Latino of any race were 1.30% of the population.

There were 615 households, out of which 40.3% had children under the age of 18 living with them, 55.9% were married couples living together, 9.6% had a female householder with no husband present, and 29.6% were non-families. 25.4% of all households were made up of individuals, and 9.9% had someone living alone who was 65 years of age or older. The average household size was 2.62 and the average family size was 3.18.

In the town, the population was spread out, with 30.8% under the age of 18, 8.8% from 18 to 24, 30.4% from 25 to 44, 19.2% from 45 to 64, and 10.8% who were 65 years of age or older. The median age was 32 years. For every 100 females, there were 98.2 males. For every 100 females age 18 and over, there were 97.0 males.

The median income for a household in the town was $35,000, and the median income for a family was $41,190. Males had a median income of $34,286 versus $21,250 for females. The per capita income for the town was $15,643. About 8.6% of families and 11.5% of the population were below the poverty line, including 12.3% of those under age 18 and 18.8% of those age 65 or over.

== Education ==
Argos Community School Corporation operates an elementary school and Argos Junior Senior High School.

The town has a lending library, the Argos Public Library.

== Notable people ==
- Eric Stults – American baseball player (born 1979)

== See also ==
- Argos Izaak Walton League Historic District
