= Oxford, Missouri =

Unincorporated community in Worth County, Missouri, United States

- Unincorporated community
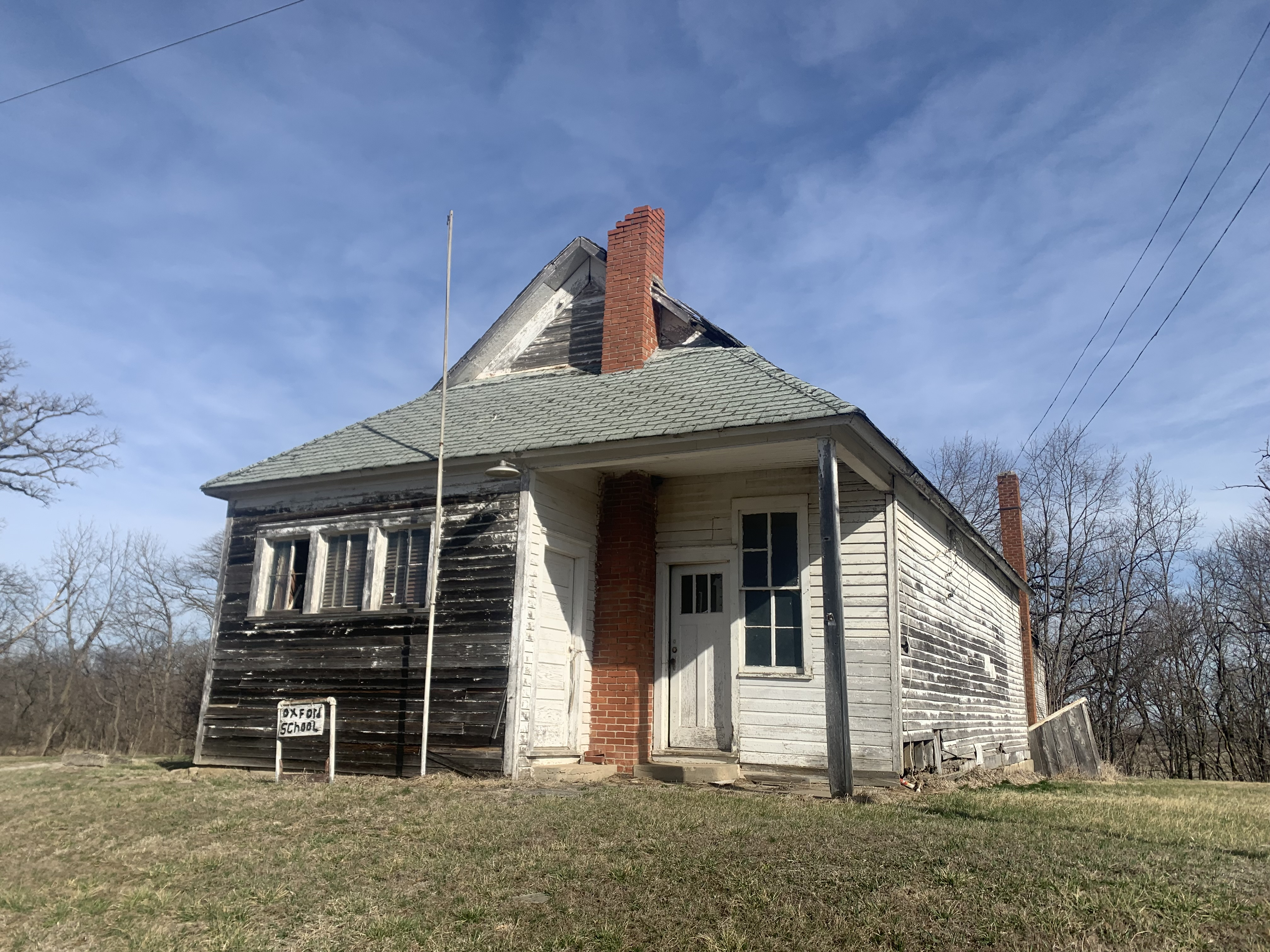
- Defunct schoolhouse at Oxford, March 2025

- Location within Missouri
- Coordinates: 40°25′16″N 94°32′26″W
- Country: United States
- State: Missouri
- County: Worth
- Township: Greene
- Elevation: 997 ft (304 m)
- Time zone: UTC-6 (Central (CST))
  - Summer (DST): UTC-5 (CDT)
- Area code: 660
- GNIS feature ID: 730172

Oxford is an unincorporated community in southwest Worth County, Missouri, United States.

== Description ==
Oxford is located on Missouri Route U approximately eight miles southwest of Grant City and five miles west of Worth. Parnell in adjacent Nodaway County is about four miles to the west. The Grand River flows past one mile west of the community. Only a cemetery remains where Oxford once was.

Old variant names were "West Point" and "Rose Hill". A post office called Oxford was established in 1861, and remained in operation until 1905. The present name is taken from Oxford, England. The population in the 1870s was about 150.
