= Argos Junior/Senior High School =

Argos High School

Location
- 500 Yearick Avenue; Argos, (Marshall County), Indiana 46501; United States; 41.2417°N 86.2504°W

Information
- Type: Public high school
- Established: 1957
- School district: Argos Community School Corporation
- Superintendent: Kerry Johnson
- Teaching staff: 27
- Grades: 6–12
- Enrollment: 320
- Average class size: 34-58
- Student to teacher ratio: 12:1
- Colors: gold and black
- Fight song: On Wisconsin
- Athletics: Soccer, Basketball, Cheerleading, Softball, Volleyball, Lacrosse, Baseball
- Athletics conference: Independent and HCCA
- Sports: Soccer
- Mascot: Dragon
- Nickname: Dragons
- Website: www.argos.k12.in.us/schools/argos-jrsr-high

Argos Junior/Senior High School is a public secondary school in Argos, Indiana, United States, educating grades 6 through 12.

== See also ==
- List of high schools in Indiana
