= Greene Township =

Greene Township may refer to:

== Illinois ==
- Greene Township, Mercer County, Illinois
- Greene Township, Woodford County, Illinois

== Indiana ==
- Greene Township, Jay County, Indiana
- Greene Township, Parke County, Indiana
- Greene Township, St. Joseph County, Indiana

== Iowa ==
- Greene Township, Iowa County, Iowa

== Kansas ==
- Greene Township, Sumner County, Kansas, in Sumner County, Kansas

== Missouri ==
- Greene Township, Worth County, Missouri

== North Carolina ==
- Greene Township, Guilford County, North Carolina, in Guilford County, North Carolina

== North Dakota ==
- Greene Township, Ransom County, North Dakota, in Ransom County, North Dakota

== Ohio ==
- Greene Township, Trumbull County, Ohio

== Pennsylvania ==
- Greene Township, Beaver County, Pennsylvania
- Greene Township, Clinton County, Pennsylvania
- Greene Township, Erie County, Pennsylvania
- Greene Township, Franklin County, Pennsylvania
- Greene Township, Greene County, Pennsylvania
- Greene Township, Mercer County, Pennsylvania
- Greene Township, Pike County, Pennsylvania

== See also ==
- Green Township (disambiguation)
