= Argos Downtown Historic District =

Historic district in Indiana, United States

- U.S. National Register of Historic Places
- U.S. Historic district
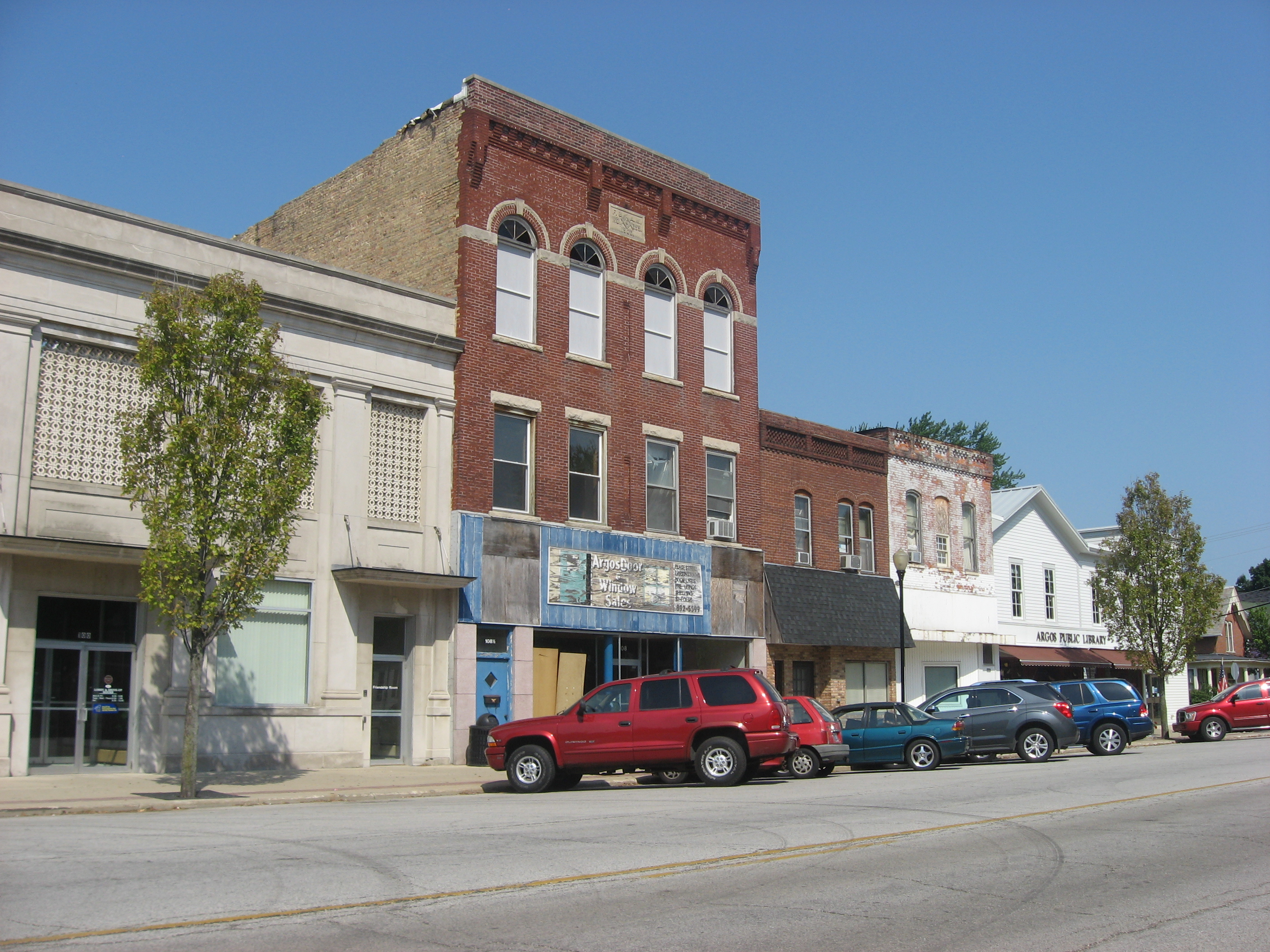
- Argos Downtown Historic District, July 2012

- Location within Indiana Location within the United States
- Location: W side of Michigan St, bet. Smith and Williams, E side bet. Smith and Walnut, Argos, Indiana
- Coordinates: 41°14′12″N 86°14′43″W
- Area: 5 acres (2.0 ha)
- Architectural style: Italianate, Romanesque, et al.
- NRHP reference No.: 01000991
- Added to NRHP: September 16, 2001

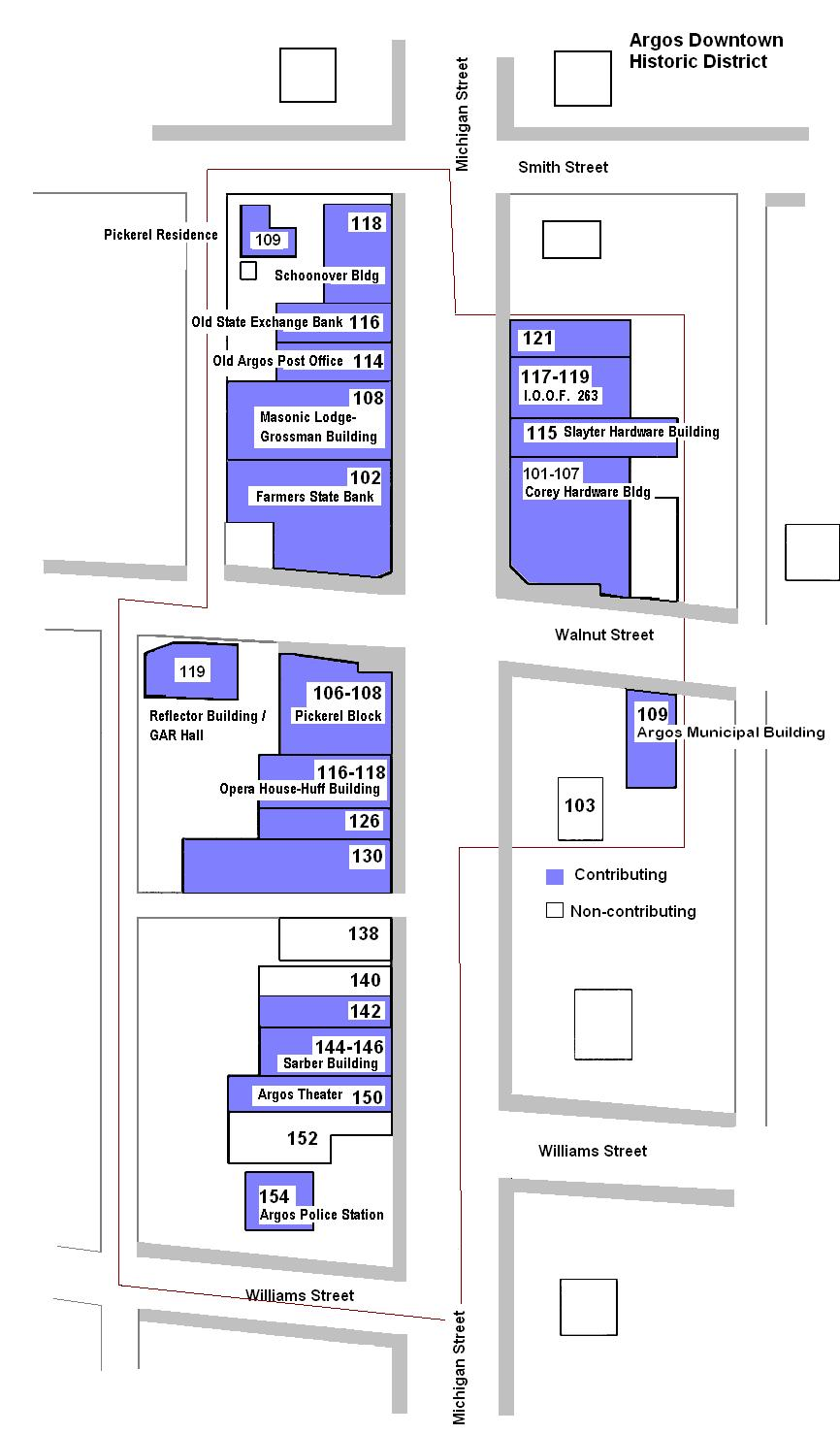
Argos Downtown Historic District is a national historic district located at Argos, Marshall County, Indiana.

Argos Downtown Historic District is a national historic district located at Argos, Indiana. The district encompasses 21 contributing buildings in the central business district of Argos. It developed between about 1867 and 1942, and includes examples of Italianate, Romanesque Revival, and Neoclassical style architecture. Notable buildings include the Reed Block (1891), Williams Inn (1838), IOOF #263 Hall (1901–1907), Corner Hardware Building (1883), Argos Reflector Building / GAR Hall (c. 1898), Argos Theater (1898–1907, c. 1930), Sarber Building (1892–1898), Old Argos Opera House / Huff Block (1887–1892), Pickerl Block (1887, 1892–1898), Argos Municipal Building (1940), Farmers State Bank Block (1917), Argos Masonic Lodge #399 / Grossman Building (1906), Schoonover Building (1867, 1883), and Pickerl Residence (c. 1870, c. 1920).

It was listed on the National Register of Historic Places in 2001.

The town of Argos lies in Walnut Township, Marshall County, Indiana, along the Michigan Road where it intersects with State Road 10, formerly known as the Wabash Road and now known within the town limits as Walnut Street. The district comprises three blocks lining Michigan Street. Historically, these blocks were primarily commercial in nature with development radiating from the intersection of Michigan and Walnut Streets (primarily eastward on Walnut to the railroad and the plat of Fremont). The Michigan Road was main road between Indianapolis and Lake Michigan. The district's remains the commercial center of the surrounding community. Examples of 19th and early 20th century architecture characterize district. The district is an example the small midwestern downtowns from 1867 through 1942.

== Architecture ==
The architecture of the district is varied in styles, with a near full range of those styles typical to Midwestern towns during the period of significance from 1867 to 1942. This concentration of structures in a commercial section of a town plat reflects the character of typical Michigan Road towns. There are four notable buildings of different styles that best exemplify the range of architecture during the period of significance. The earliest is the Schoonover Building, a 19th-century building. It is a rare example of early frame ‘commercial’ building. These usually are replaced during the business’ life with a brick buildings. A second example is the old Argos Opera House-Huff Building which is ‘railroad town’ Italianate architecture of the late 1800s. The Masonic Lodge-Grossman Building is Romanesque Revival style. The Farmers State Bank is in the Neo-Classical style.

== Significant structures ==
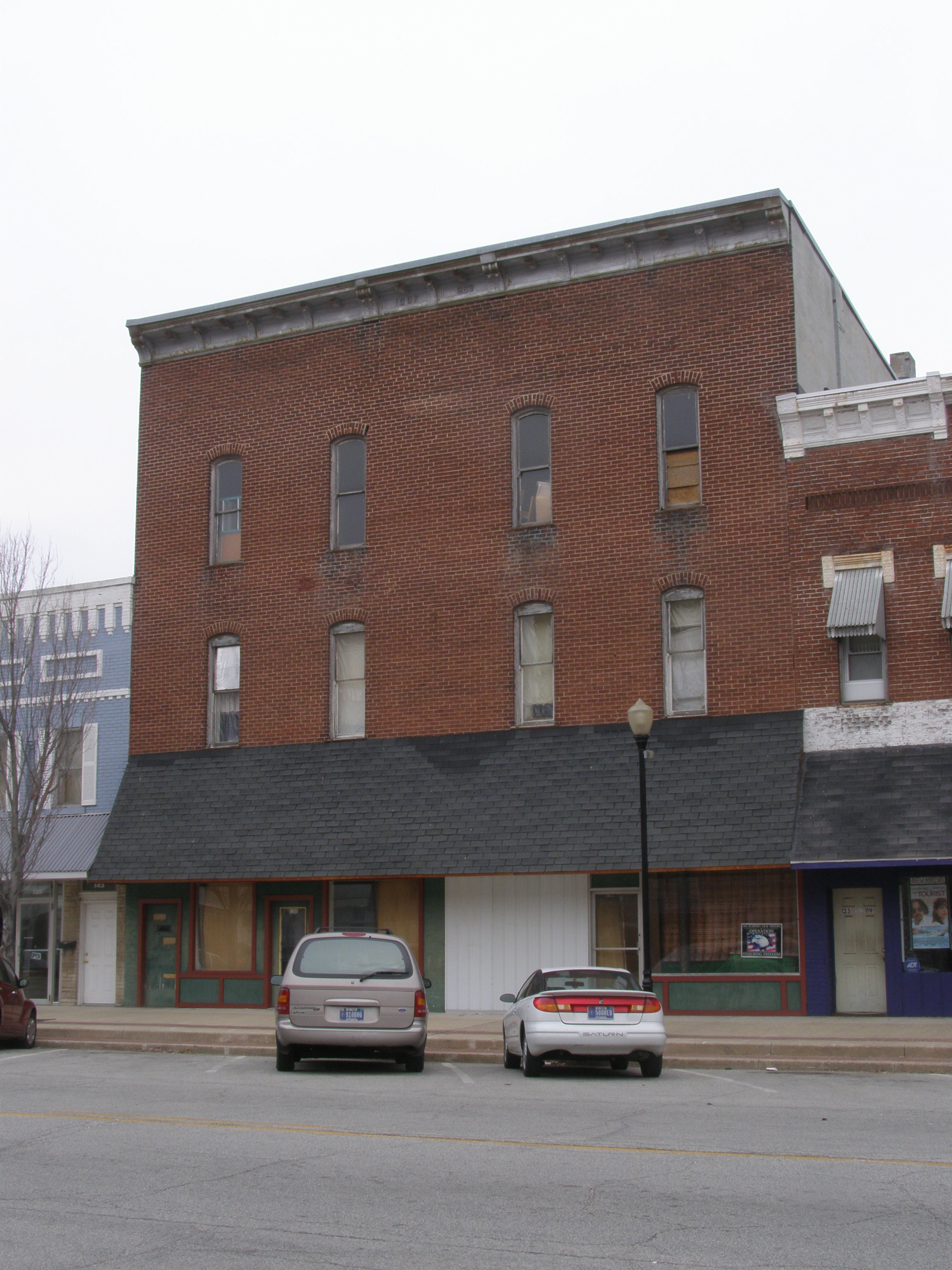
I.O.O.F. Hall, 117-119 North Michigan Street (1901<1907) in the Argos Downtown Historic District.

- 117-119 North Michigan Street 1901<1907 I.O.O.F. Hall is a contributing structure. This two bay brick building standing 3 stories tall and uses an Italianate style. The street level commercial fronts have been modernized. The Canopy over the sidewalk was also added. The upper facade includes four half-round, brick arched windows each floor. It is topped with a bracketed metal cornice with "IOOF” and "263", the lodge number, in raised lettering in the center. A stairwell entry to the upper lodge floors is located on the street front at the north corner of the building.

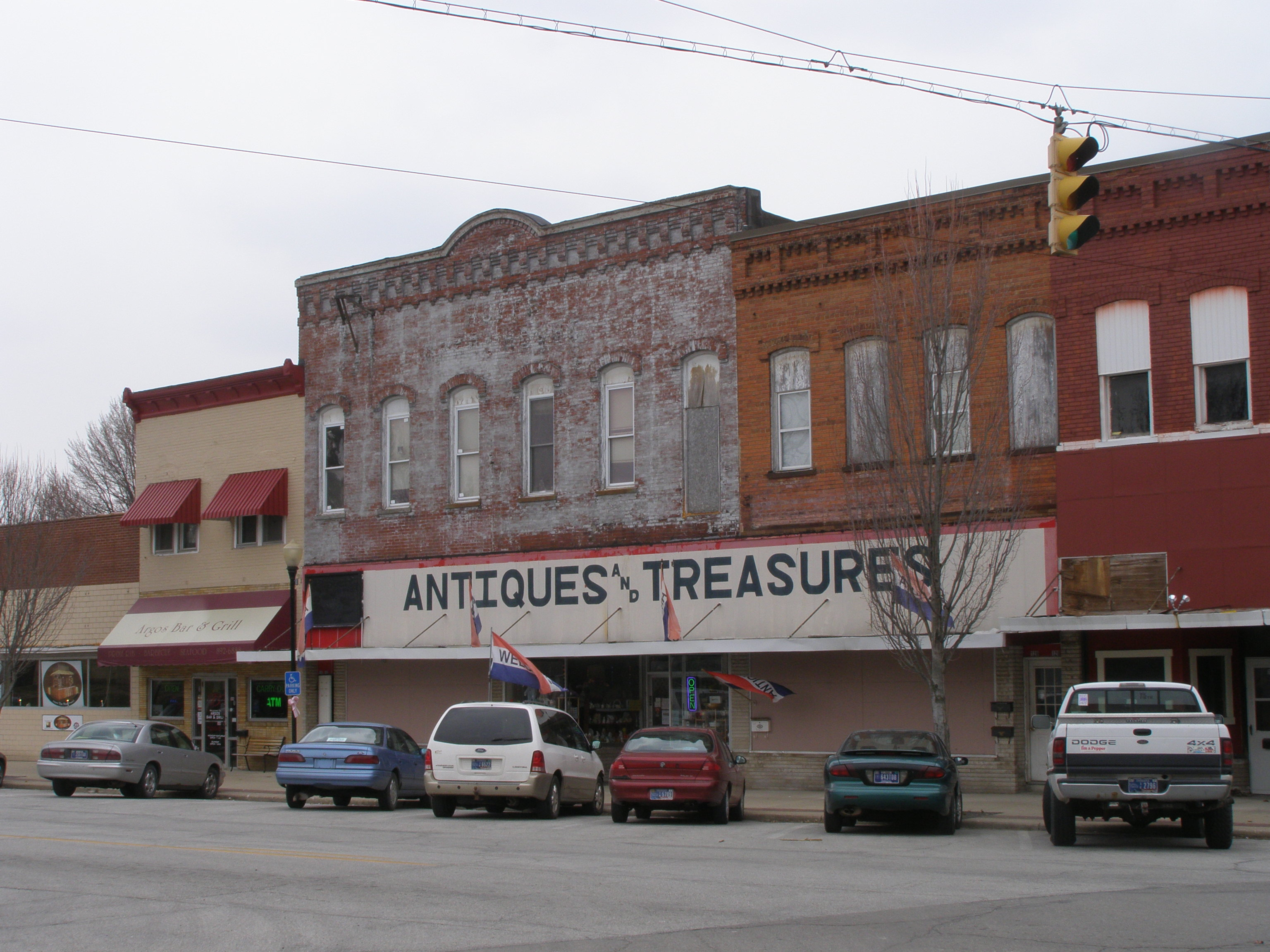
Old Argos Opera House / Huff Block, 116-118 South Michigan Street (1887<1892) in the Argos Downtown Historic District.

- 116-118 South Michigan Street 1887<1892 Old Argos Opera House / Huff Block is an Italianate, two-story, brick building, two bay in width. It dominates the 100 block of South Michigan in its height and design. The street level facade has been modernized with aluminum and glass. The upper facade remains unchanged. On the second floor are six masonry openings with half-round brick arches. The northern window has a lower sill, which would have provided access to a porch along the front over the sidewalk. The sills are smooth-faced limestone and the brick arches form hoods slightly raised from the face of the facade. The building is topped with a brick parapet of a simple corbelled design with stepped horizontal courses and vertical "brackets". The center of the parapet is a brick half-round approximately 6 by 2 feet (1.83 by 0.61 m) high. Access to the Opera hall on the second floor is from a stairwell at the south end (left) of the building.
- 102 North Michigan Street 1917 Farmers State Bank Block is a Neo-Classical, two-story, masonry building. Located on the Corner of Walnut and Michigan Streets, it has two complete limestone facades. Its height is accentuated by using elongated pilasters rising from the foundation to the pediment. This creates artificial bays. This is one of the few buildings that retains it original architecture at the street level. It is faced with smooth-faced cut limestone. Two horizontal rows of large blocks form a base, which is capped with a continuous water table. The water table acts as a plinth for the pilasters. Each pilaster has a simple base and is topped with a squared Doric capitals. The Walnut Street façade is separated into six two-story bays. A single two-story bay is angled toward the intersecting streets. On Michigan Street, the south half of the facade is the original c. 1915. It is separated into three two-story bays. The main entrance is in the center bay. The north half was added about 1960 and duplicates the original, but it is only a single story.

In each bay of the bank, are window openings using a recessed limestone panel and a raised rectangular frame. The northern section (1960 addition) is only one story, but the roof line has been maintained with a limestone screen. Where window openings exist in the original part, there is patterned stone block. The window and entrances have been modernized. A cornice marks the roof line on both street fronts. The cornice is topped with a limestone parapet.

== Bibliography ==
1. Hunter, Jaunita. Marshall County and the Michigan Road Marshall County Historical Society Quarterly Vol. 20, No. 2, 1991
2. McDonald, Daniel. History of Marshall County 1836–1881, Kingman Brothers, Chicago, IL 1881.
3. VanDer Wheele, Wayne. A Story of Historical Interest. Argos Centennial, local publication. 1951
4. Marshall County Historical Society. History of Marshall County Sesquicentennial 1836–1986, Taylor Publishing Co. USA, 1986
5. Sanborn maps for Argos, Walnut Twp. Marshall County, IN 1892, 1898, 1907, 1913, 1924.
6. Historic Landmarks Foundation of Indiana. Marshall County Interim Report: Historic Sites and Structures Survey, 1990.
7. Various items from the Argos Reflector: January 22, 1885; March 17, 1898; August 2, 1900; August 23, 1900; September 17, 1931
