= Pine Flats, Pennsylvania =

Unincorporated community in Pennsylvania, U.S.

Coordinates: 40.659084°N 78.920212°W

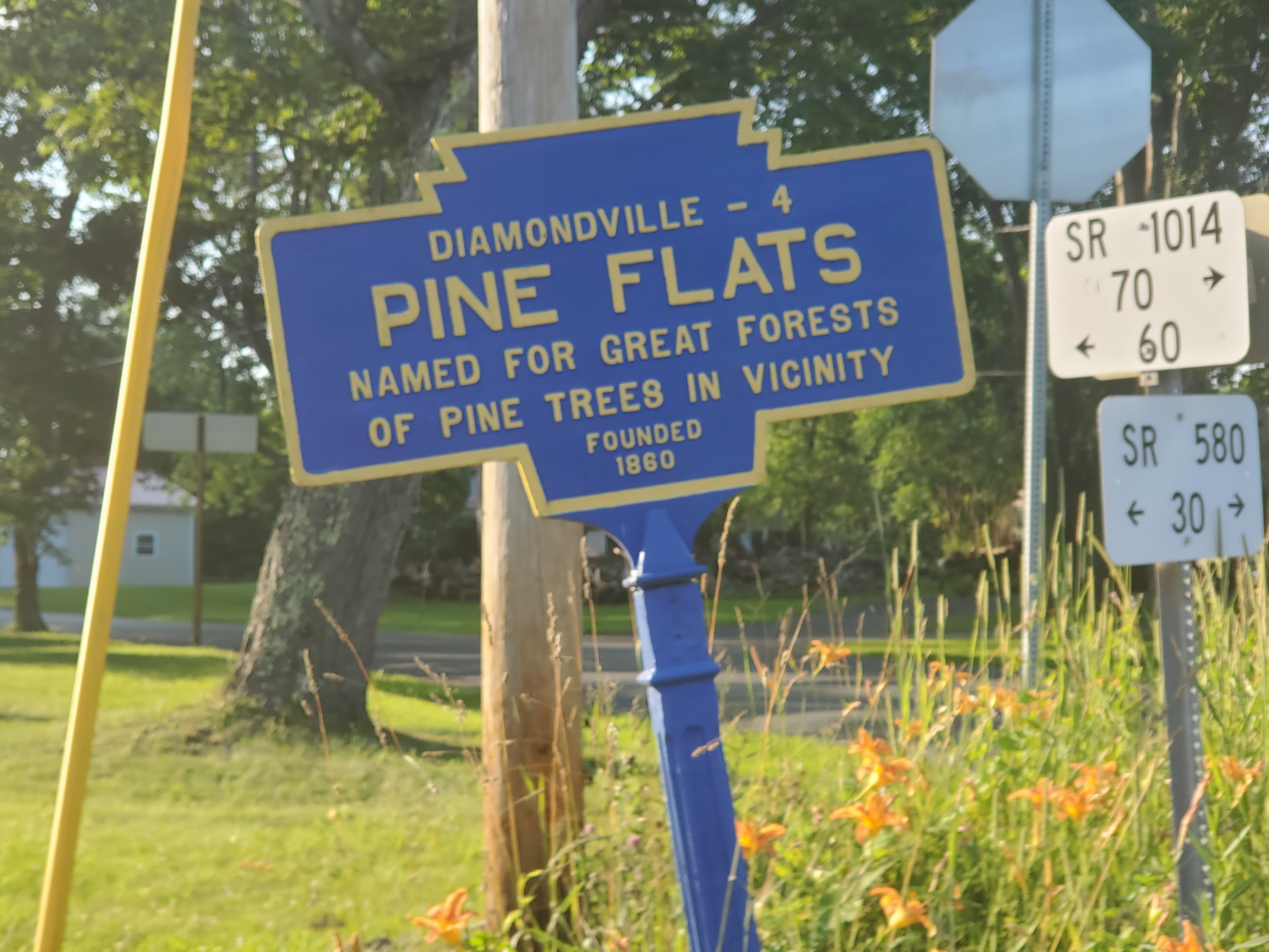
Sign in Pine Flats

Pine Flats is an unincorporated community located in Green Township, Indiana County, Pennsylvania, United States. It is located on Manor Road (Route 580) at the intersection with Wandin Road, Pine Flats Road, and Evergreen Road.

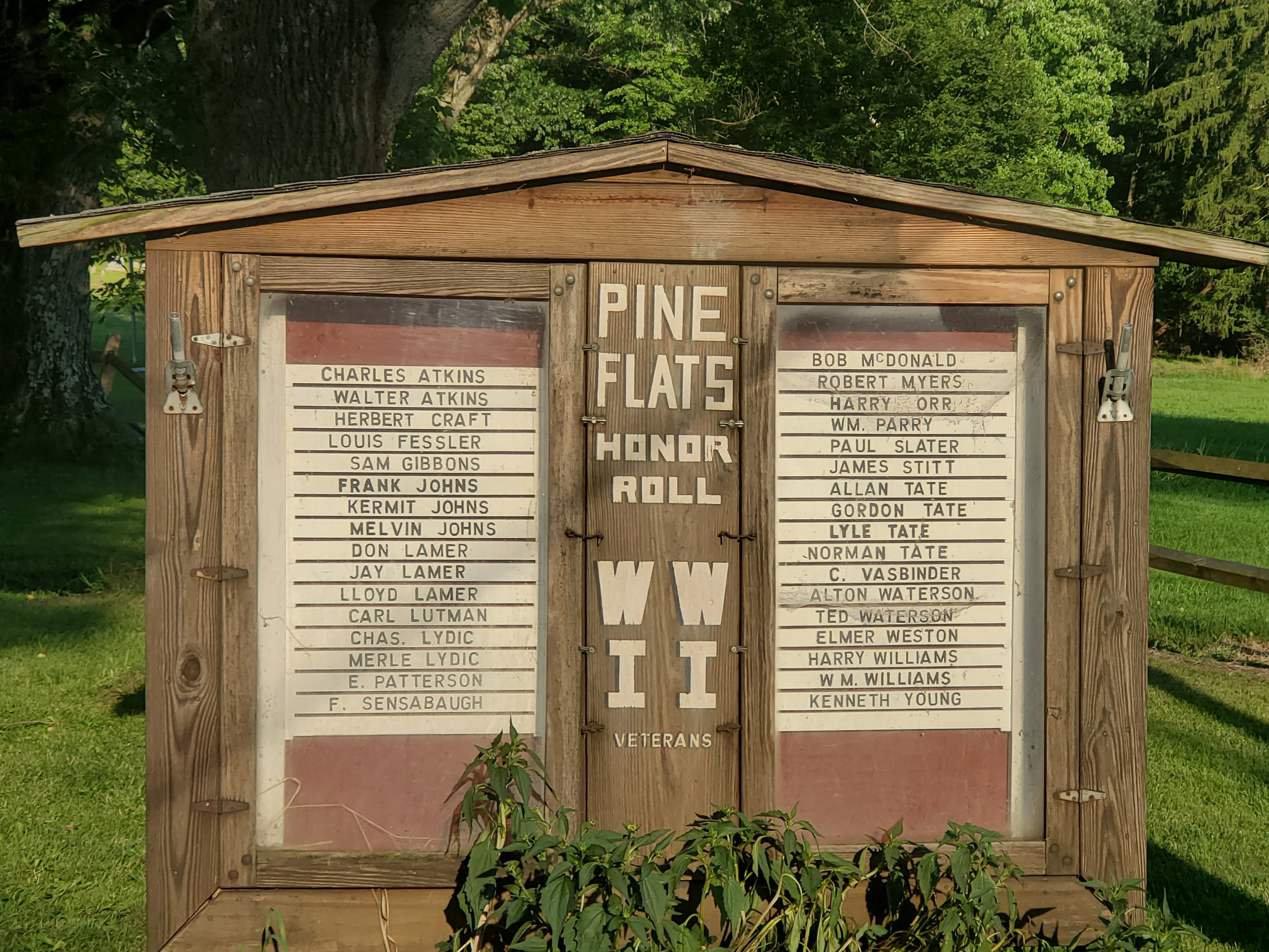
Memorial listing World War II veterans from Pine Flats

== Geology ==
Pine Flats is underlain by the Pennsylvanian age Glenshaw Formation. Low hills and knobs surrounding the town are formed by the overlying Casselman Formation. The axis of the Brush Valley Syncline trends northeast west of town.
