= Starford, Pennsylvania =

Unincorporated community in Pennsylvania, US

- Unincorporated community
- Location within Pennsylvania Location within the United States
- Coordinates: 40°42′06″N 78°57′32″W
- Country: United States
- State: Pennsylvania
- County: Indiana
- Township: Green
- Elevation: 1,358 ft (414 m)
- Time zone: UTC-5 (Eastern (EST))
  - Summer (DST): UTC-4 (EDT)
- ZIP code: 15777
- Area code: 724
- GNIS feature ID: 1188411

Starford is an unincorporated community in Indiana County, Pennsylvania, United States. The community is 3.6 miles (5.8 km) northeast of Clymer. Starford has a post office, with ZIP code 15777, which opened on March 14, 1905.
