= Green Township, Lawrence County, Missouri =

Inactive township in the US state of Missouri

Coordinates: 37.2267°N 93.9147°W

Green Township is an inactive township in Lawrence County, in the U.S. state of Missouri.

Green Township was named for a verdant prairie within its borders.
