= Greene Township, Worth County, Missouri =

Township in Worth County, Missouri, U.S.

Greene Township
- Township
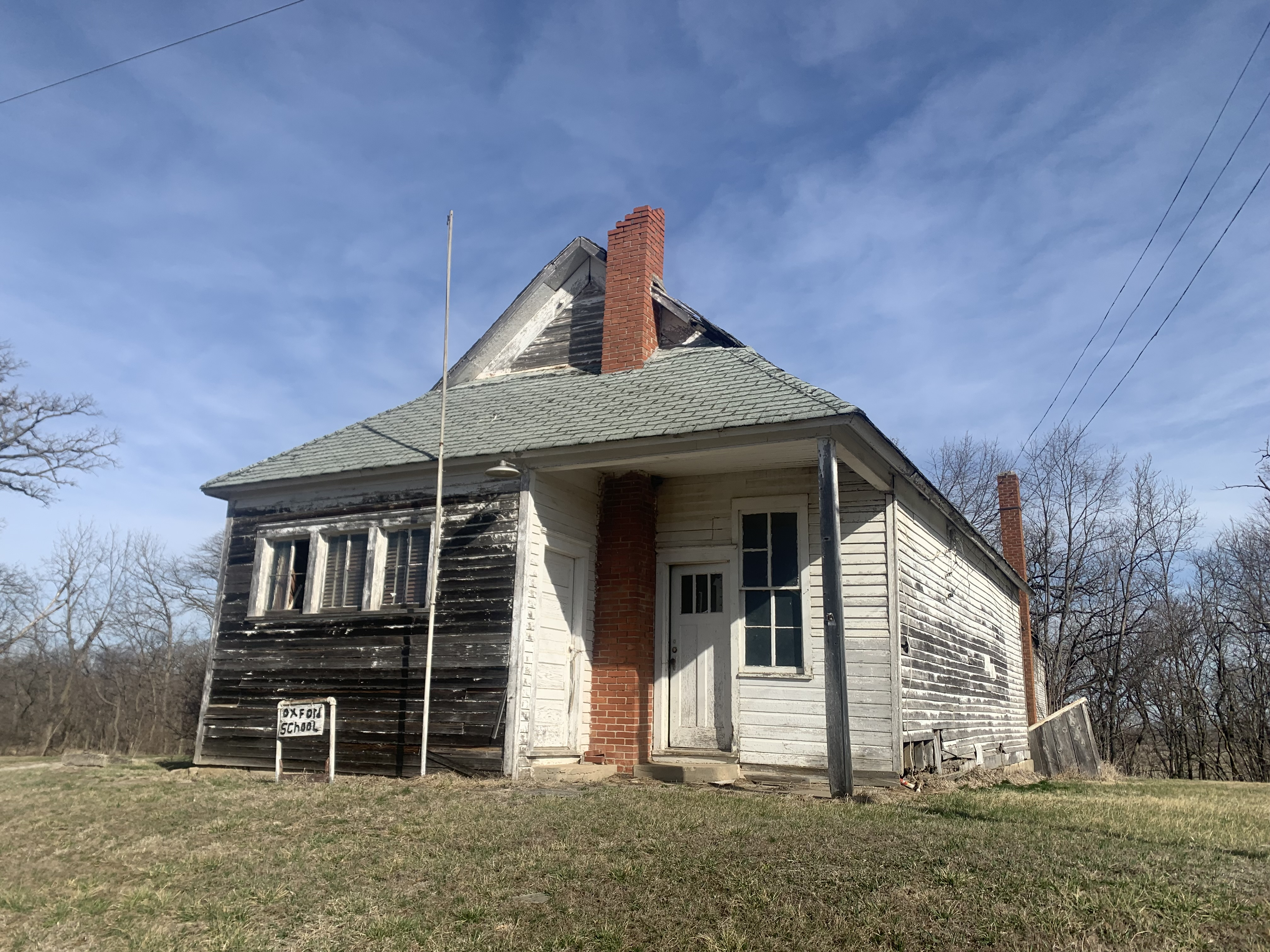
- Defunct schoolhouse at Oxford

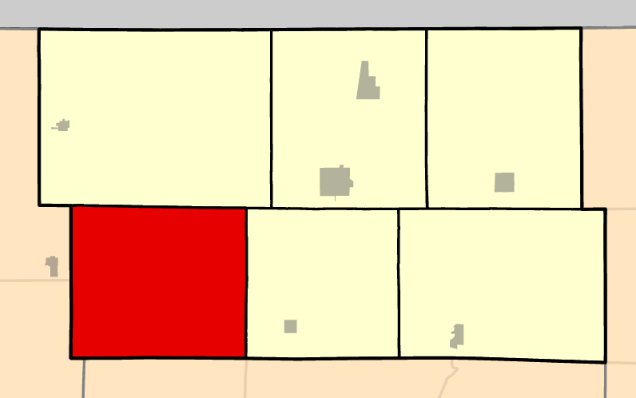
- Coordinates: 40°25′45″N 94°32′38″W
- Country: United States
- State: Missouri
- County: Worth

Area
  - Total: 39.88 sq mi (103.3 km^{2})
  - Land: 39.88 sq mi (103.3 km^{2})
  - Water: 0.0 sq mi (0 km^{2}) 0.0%
- Elevation: 928 ft (283 m)

Population (2020)
  - Total: 112
  - Density: 2.8/sq mi (1.1/km^{2})
- FIPS code: 29-22729188
- GNIS feature ID: 767541

Greene Township is a township in Worth County, Missouri, United States. At the 2020 census, its population was 112. The hamlet of Oxford existed in its center and the West Fork Grand River runs southerly through the middle of the township. It contains 49 sections with 7 being fractional.

Greene Township is named after American Revolutionary War General Nathanael Greene.

== Transportation ==
The following highways travel through the township:

- Route 46
- Route B
- Route J
- Route U
- Route W

== Gallery ==
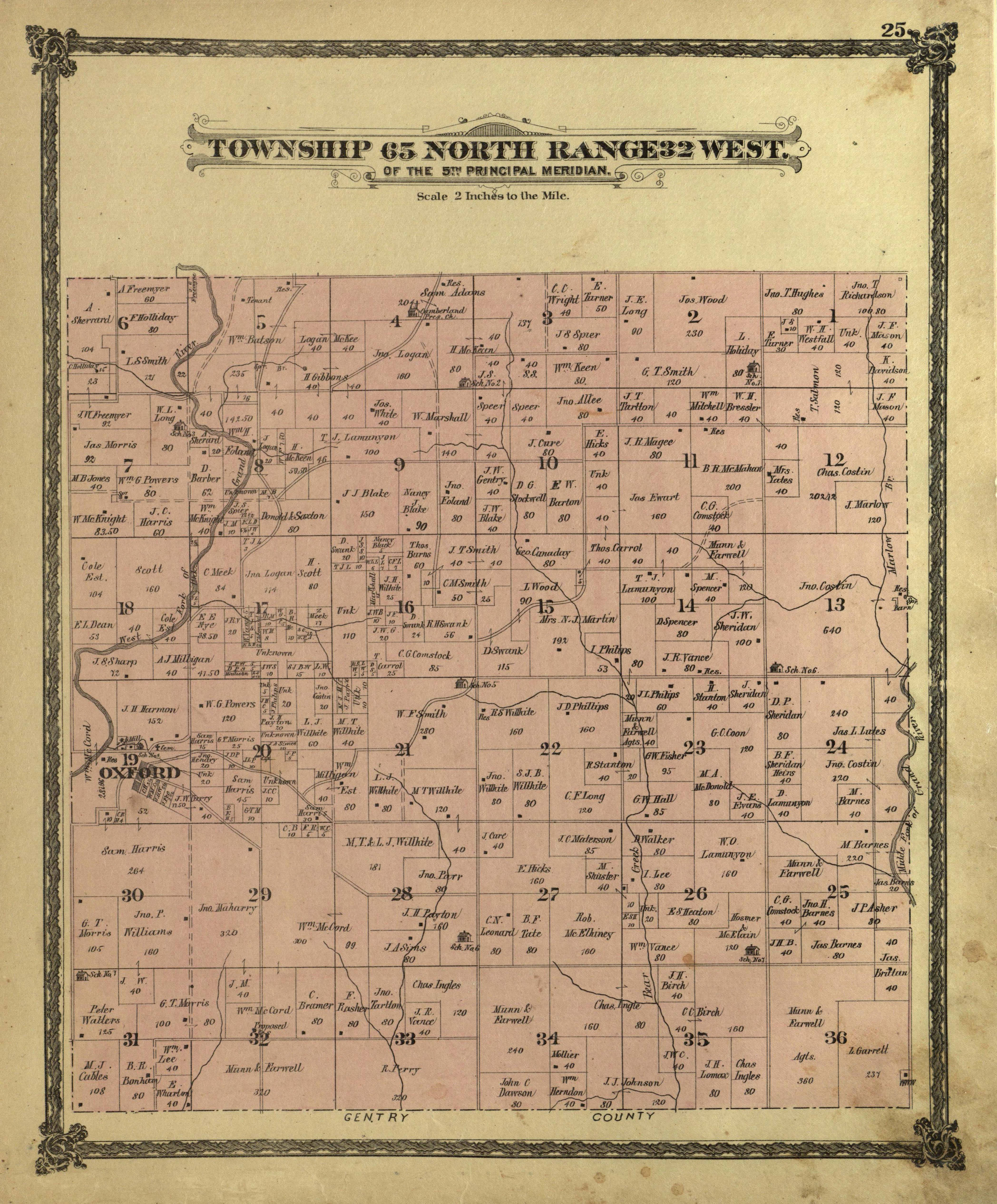
Township 65 North; Range 32 West of the 5th Principal Meridian

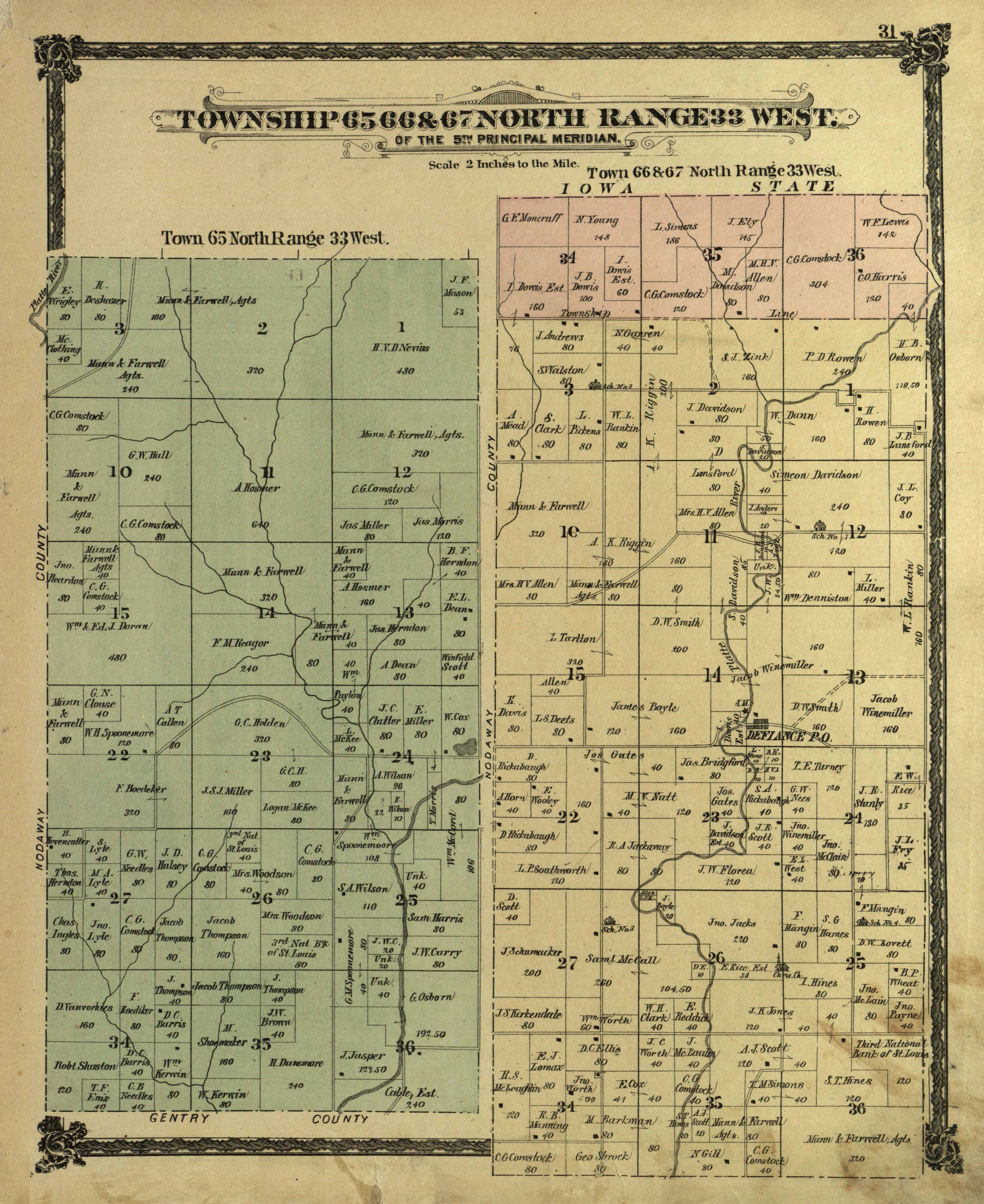
Township 65, 66, and 67 North; Range 33 West of the 5th Principal Meridian
