= Commodore, Pennsylvania =

Unincorporated community in Pennsylvania, US

- Census-designated place
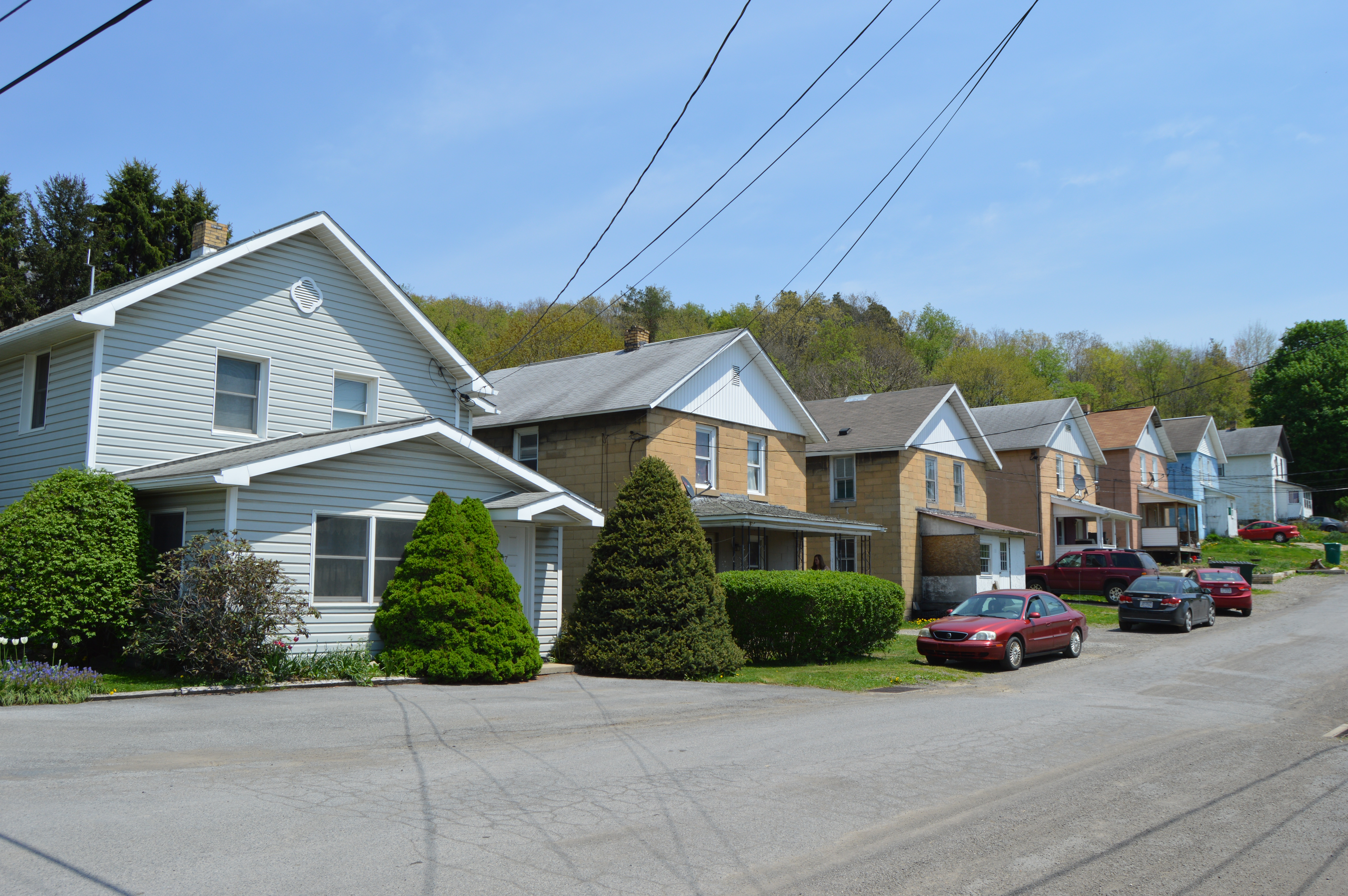
- Houses on Herriman Street

- Location within Pennsylvania Location within the United States
- Coordinates: 40°42′38″N 78°56′45″W
- Country: United States
- State: Pennsylvania
- County: Indiana
- Township: Green

Area
  - Total: 0.84 sq mi (2.17 km^{2})
  - Land: 0.83 sq mi (2.16 km^{2})
  - Water: 0.0039 sq mi (0.01 km^{2})
- Elevation: 1,420 ft (430 m)

Population (2020)
  - Total: 284
  - Density: 341.2/sq mi (131.72/km^{2})
- Time zone: UTC-5 (Eastern (EST))
  - Summer (DST): UTC-4 (EDT)
- ZIP code: 15729
- FIPS code: 42-15464
- GNIS feature ID: 1172267
- Commodore Historic District
- U.S. National Register of Historic Places
- U.S. Historic district
- Location within Pennsylvania Location within the United States
- Location: Roughly bounded by PA 286, Vanderbilt Ave., Musser St. and Fisher Ave., Green Township, Commodore, Pennsylvania
- Area: 36 acres (15 ha)
- Built: 1919
- Architect: Paul Gill
- MPS: Bituminous Coal and Coke Resources of Pennsylvania MPS
- NRHP reference No.: 94001057
- Added to NRHP: August 26, 1994

Commodore is a census-designated place (CDP) in Green Township, Indiana County, Pennsylvania, United States. The population was 331 at the 2010 census.

== History ==
Commodore was founded in 1919 by the Clearfield Bituminous Coal Corporation, a subsidiary of the New York Central Railroad. It was named in honor of Commodore Cornelius Vanderbilt, founder of that railroad. (Vanderbilt was known by the nickname or unofficial rank of Commodore due to his background as a riverboat owner.)

The town was created as a "model town", with a higher caliber of worker housing than other coal mining communities. Houses were constructed of concrete block, not wood. Also, the houses had toilets and the community had a sewer system, which were unusual in comparison to neighboring mining communities.

Streets were named after executives of the coal company: F.E. Herriman (President), John Fisher (Vice President), H.B. Douglas (Assistant to the President), A.J. Musser (General Manager), and H.J. Hinterleitner (General Superintendent). The town and its initial buildings were designed by Paul Gill, an engineer of the coal company.

The community was added to the National Register of Historic Places as Commodore Historic District on August 26, 1994. The national Historic district has 94 contributing buildings.

== Geography ==
Commodore is located at 40°42′38″N 78°56′45″W (40.710694, -78.945857).

According to the United States Census Bureau, the CDP has a total area of 0.8 square miles (2.1 km^{2}), all land.

== Demographics ==
Historical population
Census	Pop.	Note	%±
2020	284		—
U.S. Decennial Census

As of the census of 2000, there were 337 people, 126 households, and 102 families residing in the CDP. The population density was 438.7 inhabitants per square mile (169.4/km^{2}). There were 147 housing units at an average density of 191.3/sq mi (73.9/km^{2}). The racial makeup of the CDP was 98.22% White, 0.59% from other races, and 1.19% from two or more races. Hispanic or Latino of any race were 1.19% of the population.

There were 126 households, out of which 42.9% had children under the age of 18 living with them, 50.8% were married couples living together, 23.8% had a female householder with no husband present, and 18.3% were non-families. 16.7% of all households were made up of individuals, and 11.9% had someone living alone who was 65 years of age or older. The average household size was 2.67 and the average family size was 2.96.

In the CDP the population was spread out, with 30.0% under the age of 18, 8.9% from 18 to 24, 26.1% from 25 to 44, 20.8% from 45 to 64, and 14.2% who were 65 years of age or older. The median age was 33 years. For every 100 females there were 80.2 males. For every 100 females age 18 and over, there were 74.8 males.

The median income for a household in the CDP was $29,063, and the median income for a family was $31,000. Males had a median income of $23,281 versus $17,500 for females. The per capita income for the CDP was $9,502. About 13.0% of families and 18.8% of the population were below the poverty line, including 10.6% of those under age 18 and 19.6% of those age 65 or over.
