= Green Township, Forest County, Pennsylvania =

Township in Pennsylvania, United States

Coordinates: 41°32′00″N 79°21′59″W

- Township
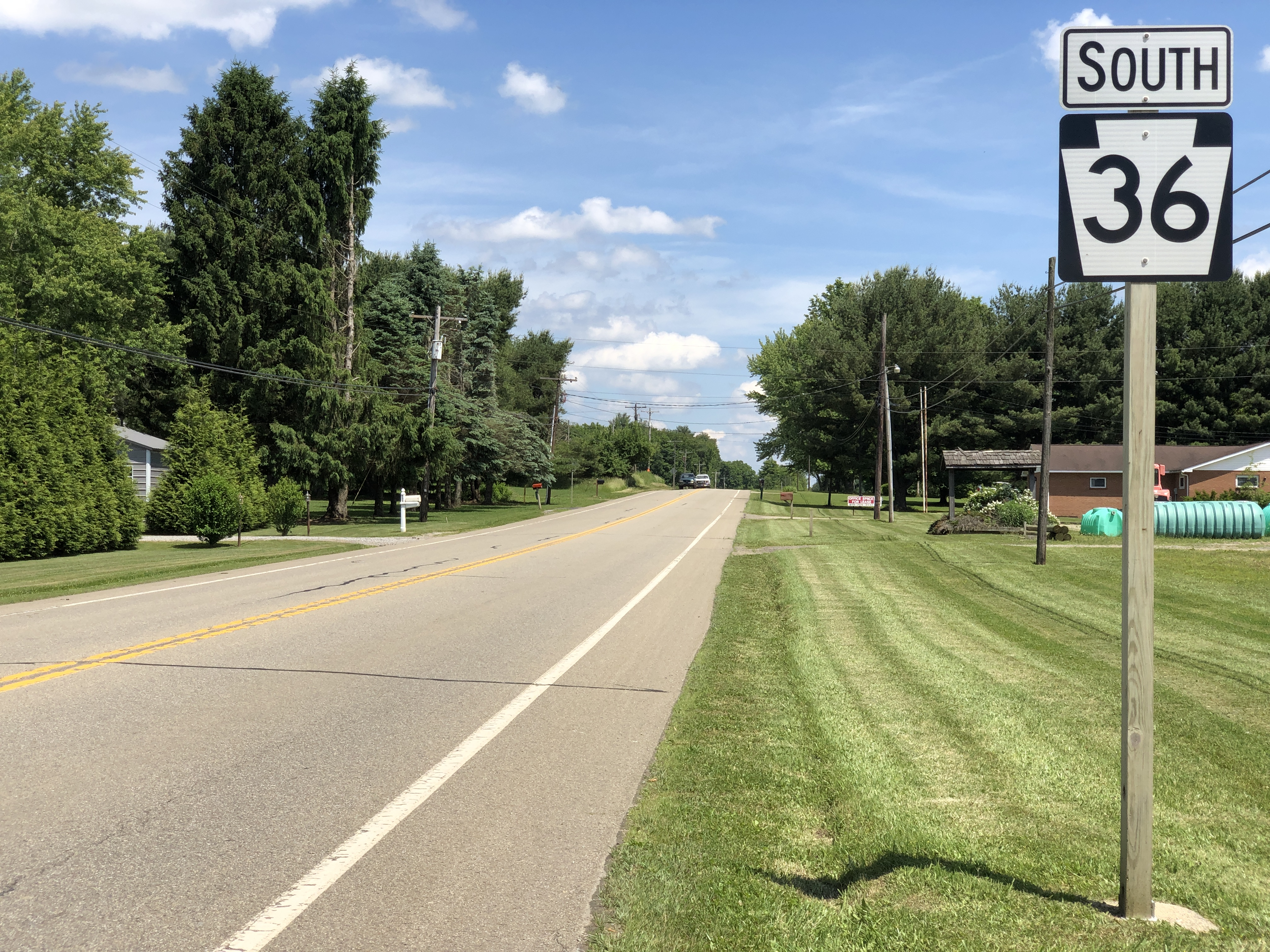
- PA 36 in Green Township

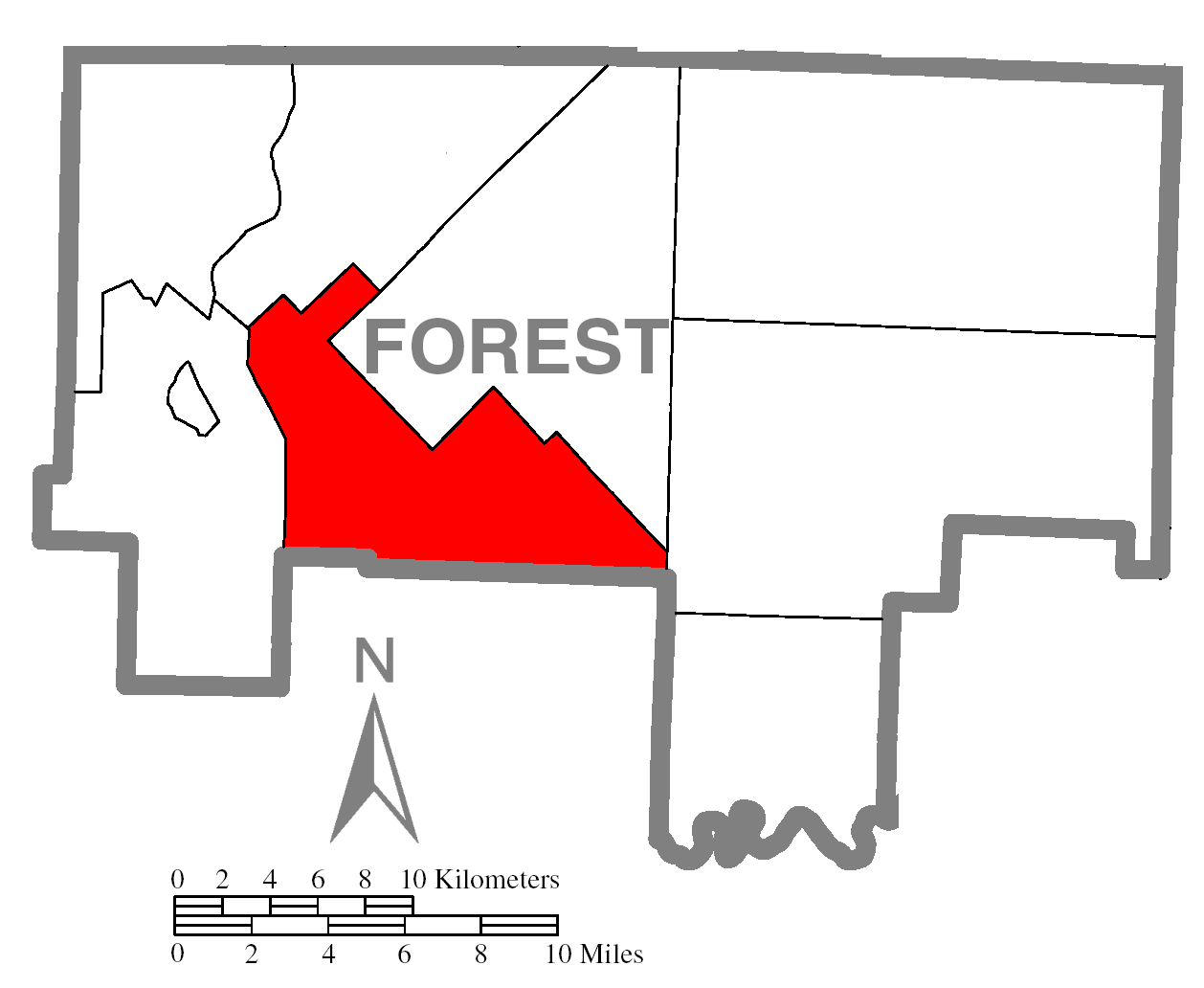
- Map of Forest County, Pennsylvania highlighting Green Township

- Map of Forest County, Pennsylvania
- Country: United States
- State: Pennsylvania
- County: Forest
- Incorporated: 1866

Government
  - Type: Board of Supervisors

Area
  - Total: 42.40 sq mi (109.82 km^{2})
  - Land: 42.13 sq mi (109.11 km^{2})
  - Water: 0.27 sq mi (0.71 km^{2})

Population (2020)
  - Total: 371
  - Estimate (2023): 358
  - Density: 8.81/sq mi (3.40/km^{2})
- Time zone: UTC-5 (Eastern (EST))
  - Summer (DST): UTC-4 (EDT)
- Area code: 814
- FIPS code: 42-053-30808

Green Township is a township in Forest County, Pennsylvania, United States. The population was 371 at the 2020 census, down from 522 in 2010, which was, in turn, an increase from 397 in 2000.

== Geography ==
Green Township is in southwestern Forest County, bordered to the south by Clarion County. Tionesta Creek, impounded as Tionesta Lake, cuts across the northwestern part of the township as it flows westerly towards the Allegheny River. The unincorporated community of Guitonville is in the eastern part of the township.

According to the United States Census Bureau, the township has a total area of 42.4 square miles (109.8 km^{2}), of which 42.0 square miles (108.9 km^{2}) is land and 0.3 square miles (0.9 km^{2}), or 0.85%, is water.

== Demographics ==
Historical population
Census	Pop.	Note	%±
2000	397		—
2010	522		31.5%
2020	371		−28.9%
2023 (est.)	358		−3.5%

As of the census of 2000, there were 397 people, 162 households, and 115 families residing in the township. The population density was 9.4 people per square mile (3.6/km^{2}). There were 1,183 housing units at an average density of 28.0 per square mile (10.8/km^{2}). The racial makeup of the township was 98.74% White, 0.25% Native American, and 1.01% from two or more races. Hispanic or Latino of any race were 0.50% of the population.

There were 162 households, out of which 27.2% had children under the age of 18 living with them, 59.9% were married couples living together, 4.9% had a female householder with no husband present, and 28.4% were non-families. 22.8% of all households were made up of individuals, and 11.7% had someone living alone who was 65 years of age or older. The average household size was 2.45 and the average family size was 2.91.

In the township the population was spread out, with 22.7% under the age of 18, 4.5% from 18 to 24, 27.0% from 25 to 44, 30.0% from 45 to 64, and 15.9% who were 65 years of age or older. The median age was 42 years. For every 100 females there were 97.5 males. For every 100 females age 18 and over, there were 104.7 males.

The median income for a household in the township was $28,594, and the median income for a family was $34,688. Males had a median income of $28,750 versus $23,500 for females. The per capita income for the township was $15,725. About 12.9% of families and 10.9% of the population were below the poverty line, including 6.6% of those under age 18 and 9.4% of those age 65 or over.
