= Green Township, Hickory County, Missouri =

Township in Hickory County, Missouri

Coordinates: 37.8481°N 93.2669°W

Green Township is an inactive township in Hickory County, in the U.S. state of Missouri.

Green Township was established in 1845, and most likely was named after Nathanael Greene (1742–1786), American Revolutionary War general.
