= Cherry Tree, Pennsylvania =

Borough in Pennsylvania, US

- Borough
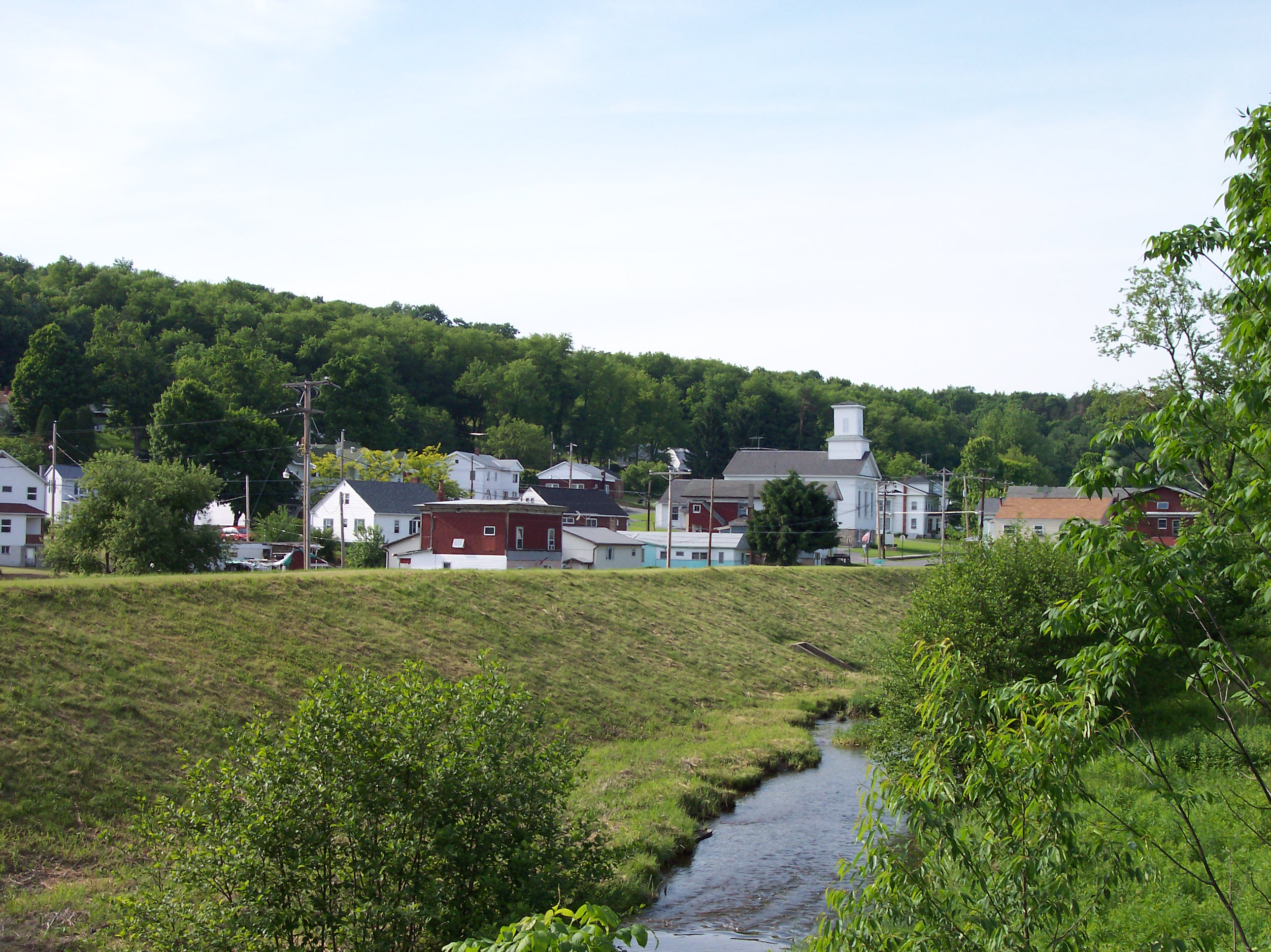
- Cherry Tree along Cush Cushion Creek, and the flood control levee

- Location of Cherry Tree in Indiana County, Pennsylvania.

- Location within Pennsylvania Location within the United States
- Coordinates: 40°43′35″N 78°48′27″W
- Country: United States
- State: Pennsylvania
- County: Indiana

Government
  - Type: Borough Council

Area
  - Total: 0.53 sq mi (1.37 km^{2})
  - Land: 0.51 sq mi (1.33 km^{2})
  - Water: 0.015 sq mi (0.04 km^{2})

Population (2020)
  - Total: 268
  - Density: 521.8/sq mi (201.45/km^{2})
- Time zone: UTC-5 (Eastern (EST))
  - Summer (DST): UTC-4 (EDT)
- Zip code: 15724
- FIPS code: 42-13120

Cherry Tree is a borough in Indiana County, Pennsylvania, United States. The population was 276 at the 2020 census.

== History ==
Cherry Tree was originally known as "Canoe Place" because its location marked the spot where the West Branch of the Susquehanna River was no longer navigable and canoes would have to portage. The latter settlement was known as "Newman's Mills" and later "Grant Post Office". The current name was officially adopted in 1907 but had been in use informally by local residents for many years before that time.

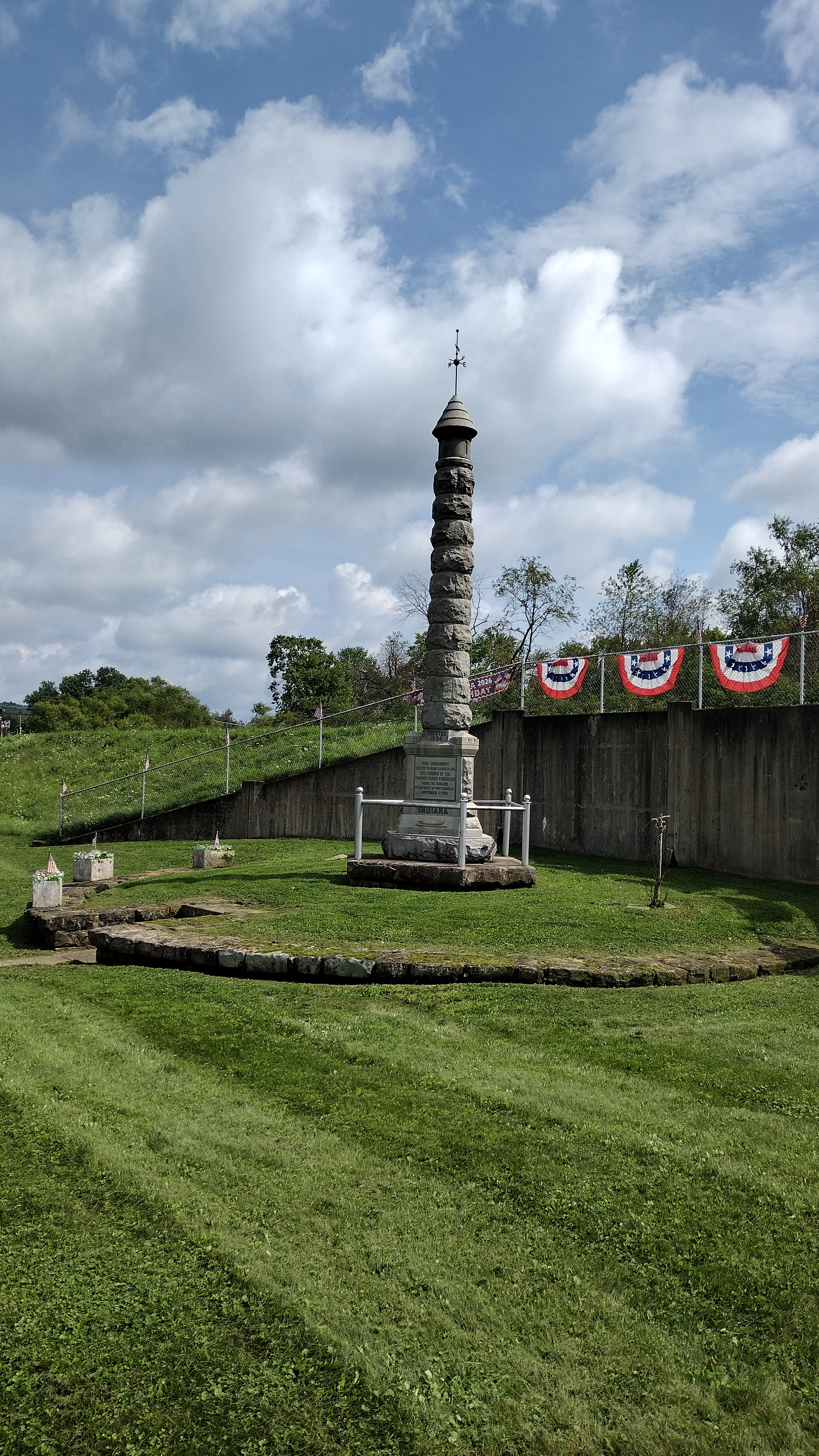
The Cherry Tree Monument in Cherry Tree, Pennsylvania

Cherry Tree was named for a large cherry tree that stood at the confluence of Cush Cushion Creek and the West Branch of the Susquehanna River. The tree marked the eastern boundary of the territory acquired by the Penn family from the Six Nations of the Iroquois at the Treaty of Fort Stanwix on November 5, 1768. The boundary, called the "purchase line", extended from the cherry tree westward to the current site of Kittanning on the Allegheny River.

Over time the original cherry tree was washed away along with other identifying features. But in 1849 the three counties adjoining the site, Indiana, Clearfield and Cambria, appointed surveyors to identify the tree's former location. Having done so, the surveyors then recommended erecting a monument. Because local people wanted the state of Pennsylvania to pay nothing happened until 1893 when the state appropriated $1,500. E.R. Carr & Co. of Quincy, Mass. was awarded the contract for the 35 foot high granite column and the monument was unveiled on Nov. 16, 1894. A war memorial was subsequently added nearby. Today the monument can be found at the corner of Maple Street and Front Street on Pennsylvania Route 580.

Cherry Tree was a center of the lumber industry in the later 19th century.

== Geography ==
Cherry Tree is situated mostly in a valley near the headwaters of West Branch of the Susquehanna River where the river is fed by Cush Cushion Creek.

The borough is located at 40°43′35″N 78°48′27″W (40.726420, -78.807558) in the eastern corner of Indiana County where it intersects with Clearfield and Cambria Counties.

According to the United States Census Bureau, the borough has a total area of 0.5 square miles (1.3 km^{2}), all land.

== Demographics ==
Historical population
| Census | Pop. | Note | %± |
|---|---|---|---|
| 1860 | 262 | | — |
| 1870 | 360 | | 37.4% |
| 1880 | 380 | | 5.6% |
| 1890 | 324 | | −14.7% |
| 1900 | 312 | | −3.7% |
| 1910 | 439 | | 40.7% |
| 1920 | 555 | | 26.4% |
| 1930 | 519 | | −6.5% |
| 1940 | 529 | | 1.9% |
| 1950 | 517 | | −2.3% |
| 1960 | 469 | | −9.3% |
| 1970 | 485 | | 3.4% |
| 1980 | 520 | | 7.2% |
| 1990 | 431 | | −17.1% |
| 2000 | 443 | | 2.8% |
| 2010 | 364 | | −17.8% |
| 2020 | 268 | | −26.4% |
| 2021 (est.) | 275 | ▲ | 2.6% |

As of the census of 2000, there were 443 people, 142 households, and 111 families residing in the borough. The population density was 833.4 inhabitants per square mile (321.8/km^{2}). There were 157 housing units at an average density of 295.3 per square mile (114.0/km^{2}). The racial makeup of the borough was 99.32% White and 0.68% African American. Hispanic or Latino of any race were 0.68% of the population.

There were 142 households, out of which 33.1% had children under the age of 18 living with them, 64.8% were married couples living together, 7.0% had a female householder with no husband present, and 21.8% were non-families. 16.9% of all households were made up of individuals, and 9.2% had someone living alone who was 65 years of age or older. The average household size was 2.86 and the average family size was 3.24.

In the borough the population was spread out, with 23.7% under the age of 18, 8.8% from 18 to 24, 28.0% from 25 to 44, 21.4% from 45 to 64, and 18.1% who were 65 years of age or older. The median age was 37 years. For every 100 females there were 100.5 males. For every 100 females age 18 and over, there were 95.4 males.

The median income for a household in the borough was $26,607, and the median income for a family was $31,625. Males had a median income of $23,667 versus $17,344 for females. The per capita income for the borough was $11,742. About 17.8% of families and 20.3% of the population were below the poverty line, including 26.3% of those under age 18 and 24.3% of those age 65 or over.

== Government ==
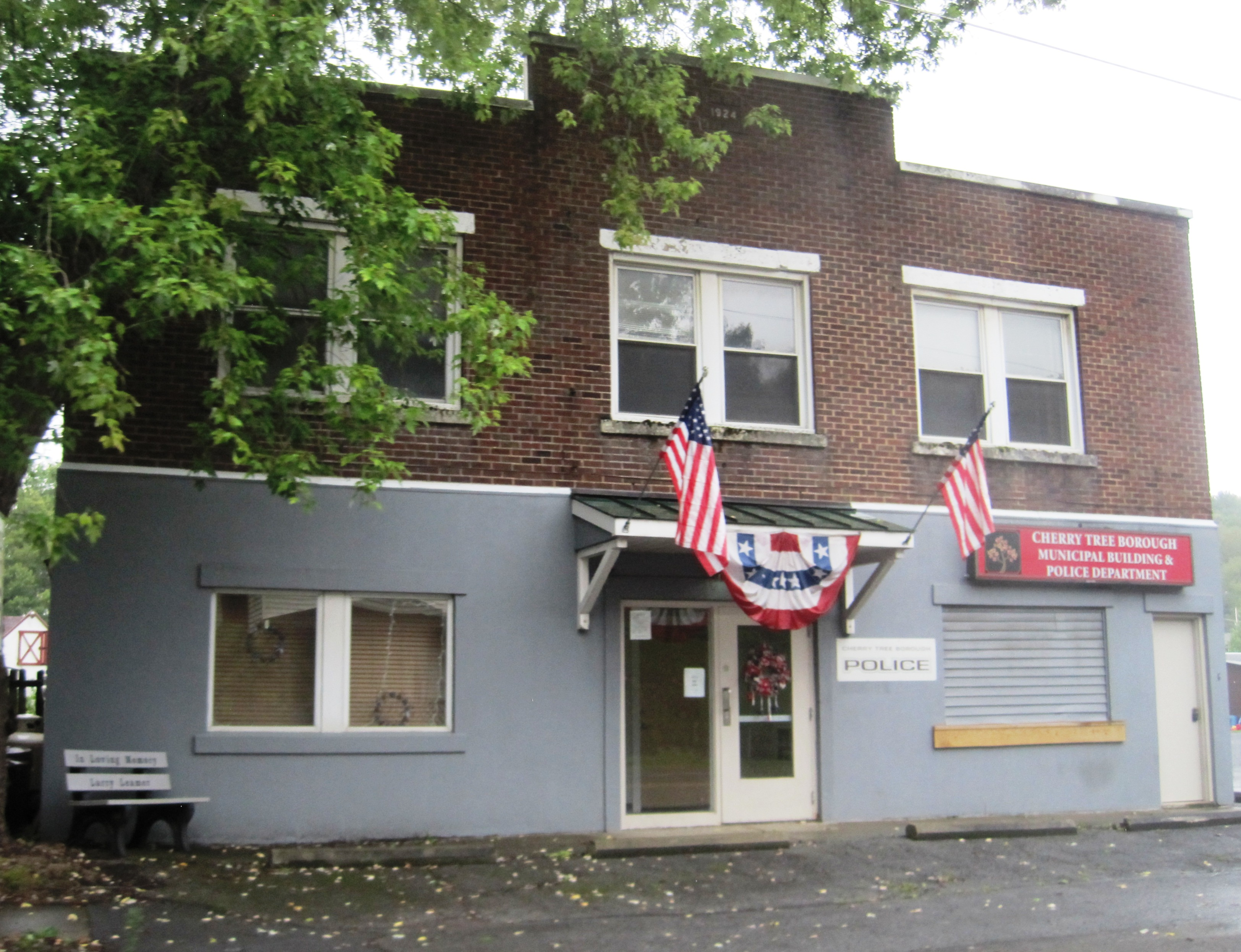
Cherry Tree Borough Hall

The borough is governed by a seven-member council and a mayor. The police department consists of three part-time officers and a police chief. The council's annual budget is approximately $85,000. Fire protection is provided by the Cherry Tree Volunteer Fire Co. The borough maintains a playground, softball fields, the Purchase Line Monument, and Canoe Place Park, which is a canoe access point along the river. Cherry Tree is served by the Harmony Area School District.
