= Green Township, Marshall County, Indiana =

Green Township
- Township
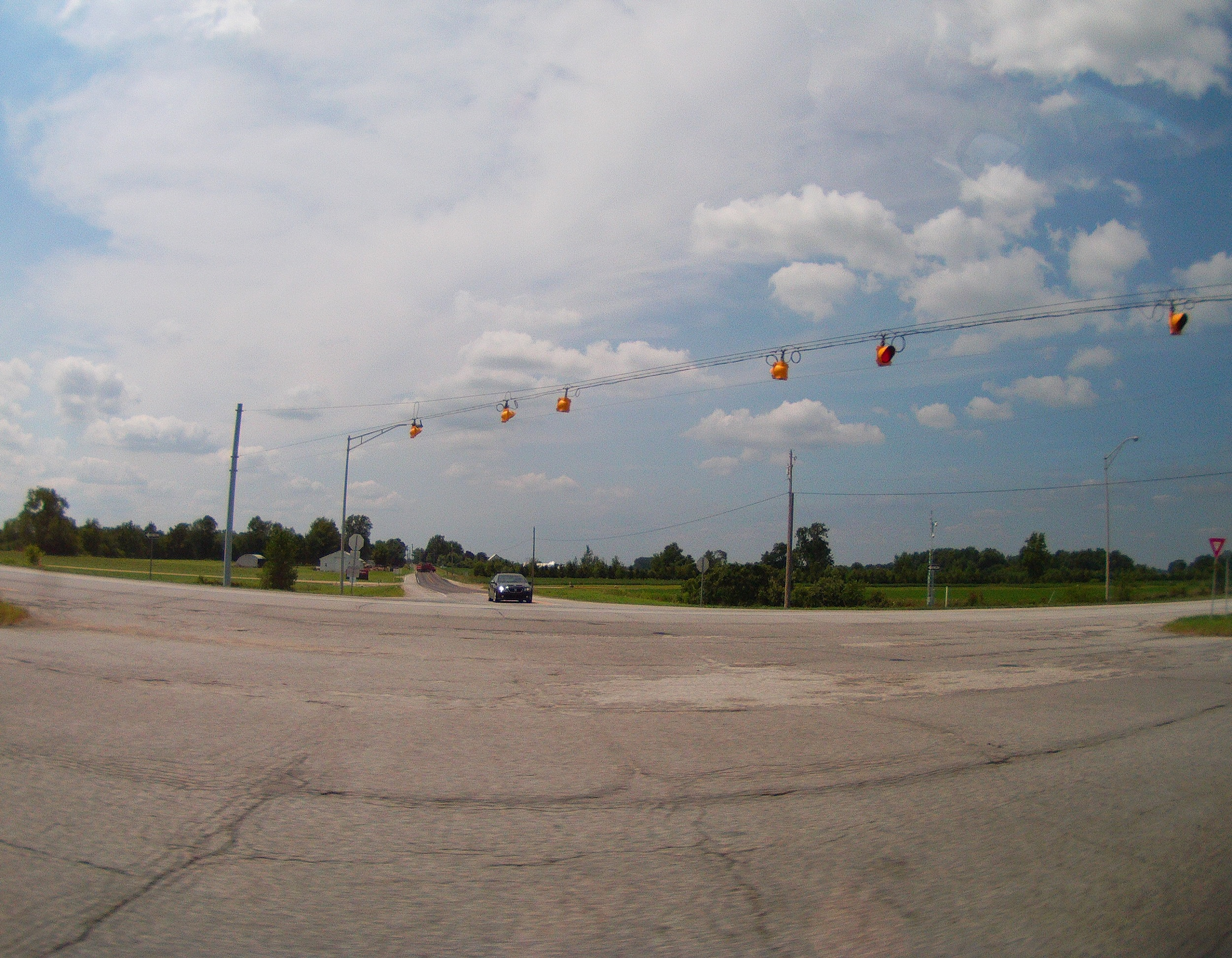
- Intersection of U.S. 31 and State Highway 10, in Green Township

- Location in Marshall County
- Coordinates: 41°13′15″N 86°18′27″W
- Country: United States
- State: Indiana
- County: Marshall

Government
  - Type: Indiana township

Area
  - Total: 33.25 sq mi (86.1 km^{2})
  - Land: 33.12 sq mi (85.8 km^{2})
  - Water: 0.13 sq mi (0.34 km^{2}) 0.39%
- Elevation: 784 ft (239 m)

Population (2020)
  - Total: 1,046
  - Density: 33.3/sq mi (12.9/km^{2})
- ZIP codes: 46501, 46511, 46563
- GNIS feature ID: 0453343

Green Township is one of ten townships in Marshall County, Indiana, United States. As of the 2020 census, its population was 1,046 (down from 1,103 at 2010) and it contained 399 housing units.

Green Township was established in 1836.

== Geography ==
According to the 2010 census, the township has a total area of 33.25 square miles (86.1 km^{2}), of which 33.12 square miles (85.8 km^{2}) (or 99.61%) is land and 0.13 square miles (0.34 km^{2}) (or 0.39%) is water.

=== Cities, towns, villages ===
- Argos (west quarter)

=== Lakes ===
- Eddy Lake
- Mud Lake

=== Major highways ===
- US 31
- SR 10

== Education ==
- Argos Community Schools

Green Township residents may obtain a free library card from the Argos Public Library in Argos.

== Political districts ==
- Indiana's 2nd congressional district
- State House District 17
- State Senate District 5
