= Greene Township, Woodford County, Illinois =

Coordinates: 40°48′N 89°6′W

Greene Township
- Township
- Location in Woodford County
- Country: United States
- State: Illinois
- County: Woodford
- Established: November 7, 1854

Area
  - Total: 35.78 sq mi (92.7 km^{2})
  - Land: 35.78 sq mi (92.7 km^{2})
  - Water: 0 sq mi (0 km^{2}) 0%

Population (2010)
  - Estimate (2016): 490
  - Density: 13.5/sq mi (5.2/km^{2})
- Time zone: UTC-6 (CST)
  - Summer (DST): UTC-5 (CDT)
- FIPS code: 17-203-31355

Greene Township is located in Woodford County, Illinois at T27N, R1E. As of the 2010 census, its population was 483 and it contained 164 housing units.

== Geography ==
According to the 2010 census, the township has a total area of 35.78 square miles (92.7 km^{2}), all land.

== Demographics ==
Historical population
Census	Pop.	Note	%±
2016 (est.)	490
U.S. Decennial Census
