= Green Township, Indiana County, Pennsylvania =

Township in Pennsylvania, US

Coordinates: 40°42′30″N 79°01′00″W

- Township
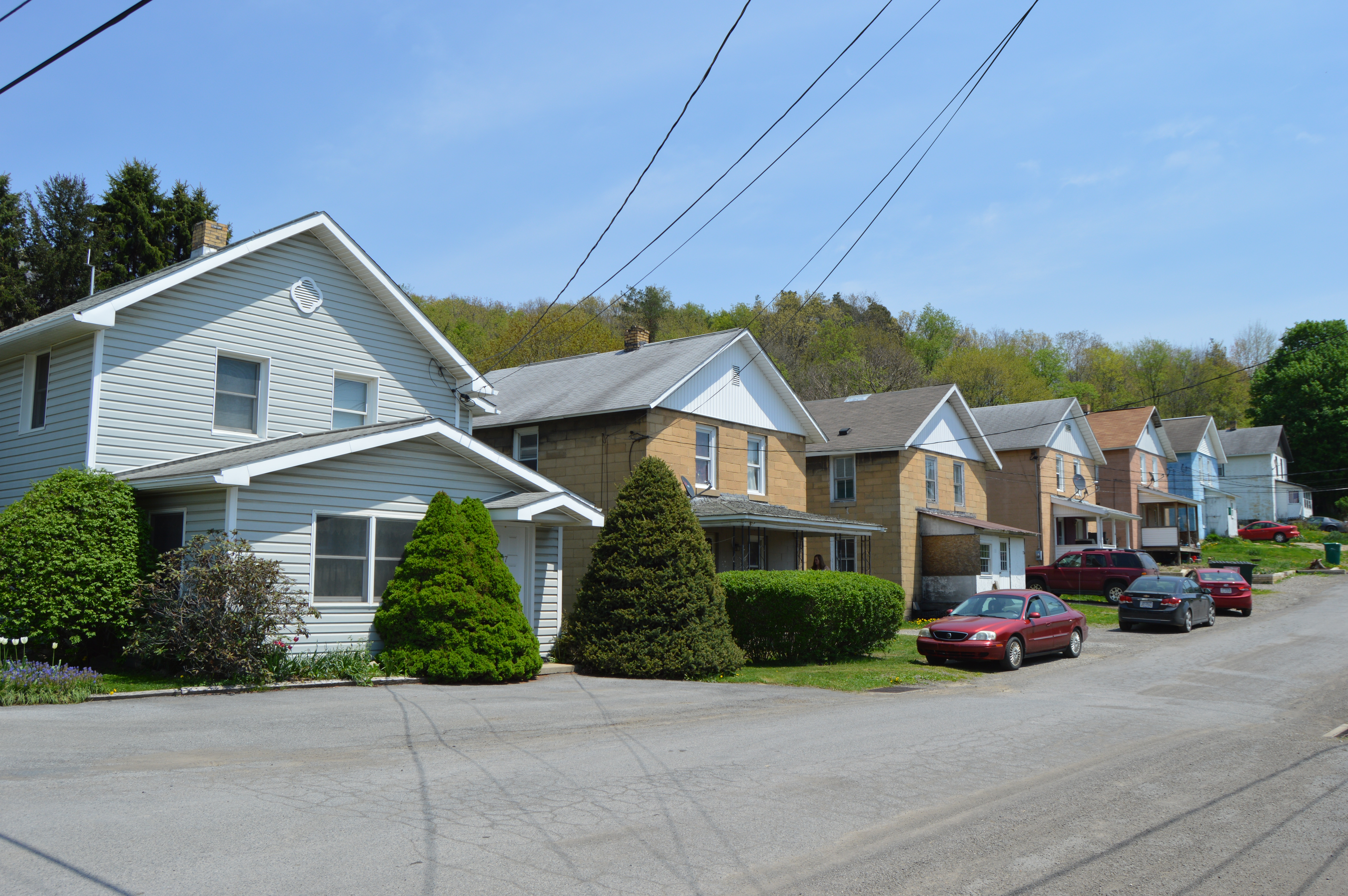
- Herriman Street in Commodore

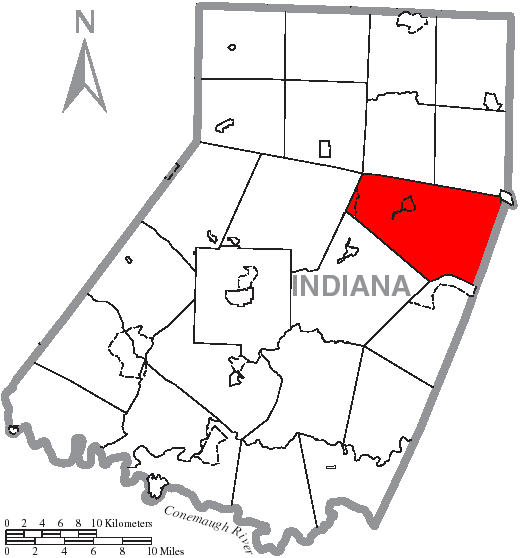
- Map of Indiana County, Pennsylvania Highlighting Green Township

- Map of Pennsylvania highlighting Indiana County
- Country: United States
- State: Pennsylvania
- County: Indiana

Area
  - Total: 52.74 sq mi (136.60 km^{2})
  - Land: 52.70 sq mi (136.50 km^{2})
  - Water: 0.039 sq mi (0.10 km^{2})

Population (2020)
  - Total: 3,457 ▼
  - Estimate (2021): 3,445
  - Density: 69.0/sq mi (26.65/km^{2})
- Time zone: UTC-5 (Eastern (EST))
  - Summer (DST): UTC-4 (EDT)
- FIPS code: 42-063-30816

Green Township is a township in Indiana County, Pennsylvania, United States. Green Township was formed from the former Wheatfield Township circa 1816 and was named for the tremendous evergreen forests covering the area. The population was 3,457 at the 2020 census. The township includes the communities of Bencetown, Berringer (previously called Kesslerville), Commodore, Cookport, Cush Cushion, Dixonville, Fleming Summit, Grisemore, Leard, Lovejoy, Martintown, Pine Flats, Prosperity Hill, Purchase Line, Shanktown, Starford, Spruce, Utah (previously Taylorsville), Uniontown, and Wandin.

== History ==
The Commodore Historic District was listed on the National Register of Historic Places in 1994.

== Geography ==
According to the United States Census Bureau, the township has a total area of 52.8 square miles (137 km^{2}), all land.

== Demographics ==
Historical population
Census	Pop.	Note	%±
1850	2,281		—
1860	1,723		−24.5%
1870	2,160		25.4%
1880	2,606		20.6%
1890	2,402		−7.8%
1900	2,128		−11.4%
1910	5,021		135.9%
1920	4,882		−2.8%
1930	5,127		5.0%
1940	5,284		3.1%
1950	4,759		−9.9%
1960	3,908		−17.9%
1970	3,480		−11.0%
1980	4,338		24.7%
1990	4,095		−5.6%
2000	3,995		−2.4%
2010	3,839		−3.9%
2020	3,457		−10.0%
2021 (est.)	3,445		−0.3%
U.S. Decennial Census

As of the 2000 census, 3,995 people, 1,431 households, and 1,153 families residing in the township. The population density was 75.7 inhabitants per square mile (29.2/km^{2}). There were 1,577 housing units at an average density of 29.9 per square mile (11.5/km^{2}). The racial makeup of the township was 98.85% White, 0.18% African American, 0.10% from other races, and 0.88% from two or more races. Hispanic or Latino of any race were 0.53% of the population.

There were 1,431 households, out of which 34.2% had children under 18 living with them, 66.2% were married couples living together, 9.7% had a female householder with no husband present, and 19.4% were non-families. 17.1% of all households comprised individuals, and 9.9% had someone 65 years or older living alone. The average household size was 2.76, and the average family size was 3.09.

The township's population was spread out, with 25.1% under the age of 18, 8.7% from 18 to 24, 27.2% from 25 to 44, 24.5% from 45 to 64, and 14.5% who were 65 years of age or older. The median age was 38 years. For every 100 females there were 99.2 males. For every 100 females aged 18 and over, there were 96.4 males.

The median income for a household in the township was $28,750, and the median income for a family was $32,338. Males had a median income of $25,813 versus $16,949 for females. The per capita income for the township was $12,524. About 10.0% of families and 14.1% of the population were below the poverty line, including 15.1% of those under age 18 and 14.5% of those age 65 or over.
