= National Register of Historic Places listings in Cole County, Missouri =

Location of Cole County in Missouri

This is a list of the National Register of Historic Places listings in Cole County, Missouri.

This is intended to be a complete list of the properties and districts on the National Register of Historic Places in Cole County, Missouri, United States. Latitude and longitude coordinates are provided for many National Register properties and districts; these locations may be seen together in a map.

There are 53 properties and districts listed on the National Register in the county.

This National Park Service list is complete through NPS recent listings posted May 1, 2026.

== Current listings ==
	Name on the Register	Image	Date listed	Location	City or town	Description
1	Henry and Elizabeth Bockrath House	Henry and Elizabeth Bockrath House	April 23, 2013 (#13000190)	309 W. Dunklin St. 38°34′30″N 92°10′50″W	Jefferson City	
2	Lewis and Elizabeth Bolton House	Lewis and Elizabeth Bolton House	August 20, 1999 (#99001017)	9514 MO W 38°26′43″N 92°09′58″W	Jefferson City	
3	Broadway-Dunklin Historic District	Broadway-Dunklin Historic District	November 14, 2002 (#02001300)	Most of 600 block of Broadway, and the 200 and 300 blocks of West Dunklin St. 38°34′30″N 92°10′44″W	Jefferson City	
4	J.B. Bruns Shoe Co. Building	J.B. Bruns Shoe Co. Building	February 26, 2021 (#100006167)	627 West McCarty St. 38°34′51″N 92°10′54″W	Jefferson City	
5	Nelson C. and Gertrude A. Burch House	Nelson C. and Gertrude A. Burch House	January 8, 2003 (#02001302)	115 W. Atchison St. 38°34′15″N 92°10′49″W	Jefferson City	
6	Oscar G. and Mary H. Burch House	Oscar G. and Mary H. Burch House	November 15, 2002 (#02001301)	924 Jefferson St. 38°34′14″N 92°10′49″W	Jefferson City	
7	Capitol Avenue Historic District	Capitol Avenue Historic District	December 28, 2005 (#05001473)	Roughly Capitol Ave., from Adams to Cherry Sts. 38°34′23″N 92°09′51″W	Jefferson City	
8	Cole County Courthouse and Jail-Sheriff's House	Cole County Courthouse and Jail-Sheriff's House	April 3, 1973 (#73001038)	Monroe and E. High Sts. 38°34′30″N 92°10′09″W	Jefferson City	
9	Cole County Historical Society Building	Cole County Historical Society Building	May 21, 1969 (#69000093)	109 Madison St. 38°34′38″N 92°10′09″W	Jefferson City	
10	Dulle Farmstead Historic District	Dulle Farmstead Historic District	December 30, 1993 (#93001468)	1101 Hwy. 54 W. 38°31′25″N 92°13′34″W	Jefferson City	
11	East End Drugs	East End Drugs	August 21, 2003 (#03000794)	630 E. High St. 38°34′18″N 92°09′52″W	Jefferson City	
12	Garnett Farm Historic District		May 31, 2016 (#16000305)	7119 MO 179; 38°42′32″N 92°22′57″W	Centertown	
13	Gay Archeological Site		January 25, 1971 (#71000466)	Address Restricted	Osage City	
14	H.E. Gensky Grocery Store Building	H.E. Gensky Grocery Store Building	June 6, 2001 (#01000628)	423 Cherry St. 38°34′07″N 92°09′54″W	Jefferson City	
15	Claud D. Grove and Berenice Sinclair Grove House	Claud D. Grove and Berenice Sinclair Grove House	November 15, 2002 (#02001310)	505 E. State St. 38°34′31″N 92°09′51″W	Jefferson City	
16	Herman Haar House	Herman Haar House	May 2, 1997 (#97000398)	110 Bolivar St. 38°35′02″N 92°10′43″W	Jefferson City	
17	Philip Hess House	Philip Hess House	November 15, 2002 (#02001304)	714 Washington St. 38°34′23″N 92°10′45″W	Jefferson City	
18	Hobo Hill Historic District	Hobo Hill Historic District	January 2, 2013 (#12001124)	500 blocks of E. Miller & Jackson Sts. 38°34′16″N 92°10′11″W	Jefferson City	
19	International Shoe East End-Main Street Factory	International Shoe East End-Main Street Factory	February 1, 2021 (#100006079)	1101 East Capitol Ave. 38°34′09″N 92°09′31″W	Jefferson City	
20	Ivy Terrace	Ivy Terrace	March 16, 1990 (#90000426)	500 E. Capitol Ave. 38°34′26″N 92°09′57″W	Jefferson City	
21	Jefferson City Community Center	Jefferson City Community Center	May 14, 1992 (#92000503)	608 E. Dunklin St. 38°34′04″N 92°10′12″W	Jefferson City	
22	Jefferson City National Cemetery	Jefferson City National Cemetery	October 1, 1998 (#98001221)	1024 E. McCarty St. 38°34′06″N 92°09′42″W	Jefferson City	
23	Jefferson Female Seminary	Jefferson Female Seminary	February 24, 2000 (#00000087)	416 and 420 E. State St. 38°34′32″N 92°09′56″W	Jefferson City	
24	Kaullen Mercantile Company	Kaullen Mercantile Company	November 21, 2002 (#02001402)	900 and 902 E. High St. 38°34′09″N 92°09′43″W	Jefferson City	
25	Lansdown-Higgins House		November 12, 1999 (#99001311)	5240 Tanner Bridge Rd. 38°30′23″N 92°12′19″W	Jefferson City	
26	Lincoln Univ. Hilltop Campus Historic District	Lincoln Univ. Hilltop Campus Historic District	April 28, 1983 (#83000978)	820 Chestnut St.; also another part of 820 Chestnut St. 38°33′51″N 92°10′09″W	Jefferson City	"Another part" represents a boundary increase of August 21, 2002
27	Lohman's Landing Building	Lohman's Landing Building	February 25, 1969 (#69000094)	W corner of Jefferson and Water Sts. 38°34′39″N 92°10′14″W	Jefferson City	Part of the Jefferson Landing State Historic Site
28	Frank Miller Green Berry Road Historic District		March 21, 2022 (#100007507)	1427, 1431 and 1503 Green Berry Rd. 38°32′54″N 92°10′09″W	Jefferson City	
29	Missouri Governor's Mansion	Missouri Governor's Mansion	May 21, 1969 (#69000095)	100 Madison St. 38°34′41″N 92°10′12″W	Jefferson City	
30	Missouri State Capitol Building and Grounds	Missouri State Capitol Building and Grounds	June 23, 1969 (#69000096)	High St. between Broadway and Jefferson Sts. 38°34′44″N 92°10′23″W	Jefferson City	
31	Missouri State Capitol Historic District	Missouri State Capitol Historic District	June 18, 1976 (#76001109)	Bounded roughly by Adams, McCarthy, Mulberry Sts. and the Missouri River; also the 200 block of W. McCarty St. and 406-408 Washington St. 38°34′39″N 92°10′16″W	Jefferson City	Second set of addresses represents a boundary increase of July 17, 2002
32	Missouri State Penitentiary Warden's House	Missouri State Penitentiary Warden's House	October 24, 1991 (#91001518)	700 E. Capitol Ave. 38°34′20″N 92°09′47″W	Jefferson City	
33	Moreau Drive Historic District	Moreau Drive Historic District	December 11, 2013 (#13000907)	Moreau & Elmerine Drs., Fairmount Blvd., Oakwood Ave., Fairmount Ct., Lee St., Moreland Ave. 38°33′31″N 92°10′08″W	Jefferson City	
34	Moreau Park Historic District	Moreau Park Historic District	September 30, 2009 (#09000786)	3714 Wardsville Rd. 38°31′46″N 92°09′52″W	Jefferson City	
35	Munichburg Commercial Historic District	Munichburg Commercial Historic District	July 1, 2009 (#09000477)	114-130 (even only) E. Dunklin St., 610, 620 Madison St., 704 Madison St. 38°34′19″N 92°10′33″W	Jefferson City	Southside Munichburg, Missouri MPS
36	Orchard Acres	Orchard Acres	October 7, 2021 (#100007040)	2113 West Main St. 38°35′30″N 92°12′28″W	Jefferson City	
37	Lester S. and Missouri "Zue" Gordon Parker House	Lester S. and Missouri "Zue" Gordon Parker House	June 15, 2000 (#00000690)	624 E. Capitol Ave. 38°34′21″N 92°09′49″W	Jefferson City	
38	Dr. Joseph P. and Effie Porth House	Dr. Joseph P. and Effie Porth House	January 26, 2001 (#01000009)	631 W. Main St. 38°35′00″N 92°10′43″W	Jefferson City	
39	John B. and Elizabeth Ruthven House	John B. and Elizabeth Ruthven House	May 26, 2000 (#00000537)	406 Cherry St. 38°34′09″N 92°09′55″W	Jefferson City	
40	St. Francis Xavier Catholic Church and Rectory	St. Francis Xavier Catholic Church and Rectory	March 22, 2016 (#16000100)	7319 Missouri Route M 38°30′28″N 92°04′08″W	Taos	
41	Simonsen School	Simonsen School	October 7, 2021 (#100007041)	501 East Miller St. 38°34′15″N 92°10′08″W	Jefferson City	
42	Charles J. and Clara B. Schmidt House	Charles J. and Clara B. Schmidt House	January 7, 2003 (#02001303)	215 W. Atchison St. 38°34′19″N 92°10′53″W	Jefferson City	
43	John M. and Lillian Sommerer House	John M. and Lillian Sommerer House	June 12, 2007 (#07000548)	2023 W. Main St. 38°35′27″N 92°12′13″W	Jefferson City	
44	Hugh and Bessie Stephens House	Hugh and Bessie Stephens House	May 12, 2009 (#09000301)	601 Jackson St. 38°34′13″N 92°10′14″W	Jefferson City	
45	Tergin Apartment Building	Tergin Apartment Building	April 22, 1999 (#99000475)	201 W. McCarty St. 38°34′37″N 92°10′31″W	Jefferson City	
46	Albert and Wilhelmina Thomas House	Albert and Wilhelmina Thomas House	November 14, 2002 (#02001305)	224 W. Elm St. 38°34′33″N 92°10′40″W	Jefferson City	
47	Trinity Lutheran Church Historic District		February 28, 2020 (#100005004)	13007-13013 Route C 38°30′33″N 92°26′16″W	Russellville	
48	Villa Panorama	Villa Panorama	January 3, 1985 (#85000031)	1310 Swifts Hwy. 38°34′09″N 92°11′32″W	Jefferson City	
49	Joseph and Elizabeth Wallendorf House	Joseph and Elizabeth Wallendorf House	April 4, 2008 (#08000253)	701 S. Country Club Dr. 38°34′41″N 92°15′51″W	Jefferson City	
50	West End Saloon	West End Saloon	June 27, 2014 (#14000374)	700-702 W. Main St. 38°35′01″N 92°10′45″W	Jefferson City	
51	Woodland-Old City Cemetery	Woodland-Old City Cemetery	July 23, 2018 (#100002688)	1022 & 1000 E McCarty St. 38°34′06″N 92°09′47″W	Jefferson City	Woodland Cemetery was established in 1822 and Old City in 1838 - both on a ridge at the edge of the city at that time. Now the oldest cemetery in Jefferson City and perhaps the county.
52	Zion Lutheran Church	Zion Lutheran Church	November 15, 2000 (#00001374)	2346 Zion Rd. 38°32′10″N 92°15′11″W	Jefferson City	
53	William E. and Frederica M. Zuendt House	William E. and Frederica M. Zuendt House	November 15, 2002 (#02001306)	920 Jefferson St. 38°34′15″N 92°10′48″W	Jefferson City	

== See also ==
- List of National Historic Landmarks in Missouri
- National Register of Historic Places listings in Missouri
