= Bolton House =

Bolton House may refer to:

- Dr. W. T. Bolton House, Pasadena, California
- James Wade Bolton House, Alexandria, Louisiana
- Lewis and Elizabeth Bolton House, Jefferson City, Missouri
- James H. Bolton House, Bath, New York
