= Thomas House =

Thomas House and variations may refer to:

== Canada ==
- Thomas House (Oakville, Ontario)

== United States (by state) ==
- Thomas Homestead, Fairview, Arkansas, listed on the National Register of Historic Places (NRHP)
- Thomas House (Fourmile Hill, Arkansas), NRHP-listed
- Greene Thomas House, Leslie, Arkansas, NRHP-listed
- Thomas House (Escondido, California), NRHP-listed
- H. H. Thomas House, Denver, Colorado, listed on the NRHP in Colorado
- Thomas House (Louisville, Colorado), listed on the NRHP in Colorado
- David W. Thomas House, Odessa, Delaware, NRHP-listed
- Thomas Hall (Gainesville, Florida), NRHP-listed
- Thomas House (Sarasota, Florida), NRHP-listed
- YWCA Building Complex (Athens, Georgia), includes the Stevens Thomas House, NRHP-listed
- Owens–Thomas House, Savannah, Georgia, NRHP-listed
- F. D. Thomas House, Camp Point, Illinois, NRHP-listed
- Frank Thomas House, Oak Park, Illinois, NRHP-listed
- Dana–Thomas House, Springfield, Illinois, NRHP-listed
- Lewis H. Thomas House, Virden, Illinois, NRHP-listed
- Andrew Thomas House, Camden, Indiana, NRHP-listed
- Amon Clarence House, New Harmony, Indiana, listed on the NRHP in Indiana
- Robert Thomas House, Central City, Kentucky, NRHP-listed
- Samuel B. Thomas House, Elizabethtown, Kentucky, listed on the NRHP in Kentucky
- R. H. Thomas House, Hodegenville, Kentucky, listed on the NRHP in Kentucky
- Kings Thomas III House, Lancaster, Kentucky, listed on the NRHP in Kentucky
- Jack Thomas House, Leitchfield, Kentucky, listed on the NRHP in Kentucky
- John Thomas House, Mooresville, Kentucky, listed on the NRHP in Kentucky
- Thomas House (Mulberry, Kentucky), listed on the NRHP in Kentucky
- William J. Thomas House, Mulberry, Kentucky, listed on the NRHP in Kentucky
- Solomon Thomas House, Salvisa, Kentucky, listed on the NRHP in Kentucky
- Thomas House (Martin, Louisiana), NRHP-listed
- Thomas House (Ruthsburg, Maryland), NRHP-listed
- H. P. Thomas House, Taunton, Massachusetts, NRHP-listed
- Dr. Nathan M. Thomas House, Schoolcraft, Michigan, listed on the NRHP in Michigan
- Albert and Wilhelmina Thomas House, Jefferson City, Missouri, NRHP-listed
- Frabrishous and Sarah A. Thomas House, Salisbury, Missouri, NRHP-listed
- Dr. A.O. Thomas House, Kearney, Nebraska, listed on the NRHP in Nebraska
- Dr. Roscius P. and Mary Mitchell Thomas House and Outbuildings, Bethlehem, North Carolina, NRHP-listed
- James A. Thomas Farm, Pittsboro, North Carolina, NRHP-listed
- William Thomas House, Bellefonte, Pennsylvania, NRHP-listed
- Charles Thomas House, West Whiteland, Pennsylvania, NRHP-listed
- Charles A. Thomas House, Sioux Falls, South Dakota, listed on the NRHP in South Dakota
- John W. Thomas House, Collierville, Tennessee, listed on the NRHP in Tennessee
- Thomas House Hotel, Red Boiling Springs, Tennessee, NRHP-listed
- Oscar P. Thomas House, Abilene, Texas, listed on the NRHP in Texas
- Milton and Minerva Thomas House, Park City, Utah, listed on the NRHP in Utah
- Gibbs-Thomas House, Salt Lake City, Utah, listed on the NRHP in Utah
- Abijah Thomas House, Marion, Virginia, NRHP-listed in Virginia
- Dr. Charles and Elsie Thomas House, Spokane, Washington, listed on the NRHP in Washington
- Alma Thomas House, Washington, D.C., NRHP-listed

== People ==
- Thomas William House Sr. (1814–1880), merchant and cotton factor in Houston, Texas
