= Burch House =

Burch House may refer to:

- John Burch House, part of the Quaker Hill Historic District
- Nelson C. and Gertrude A. Burch House, Jefferson City, Missouri
- Oscar G. and Mary H. Burch House, Jefferson City, Missouri
- Walter Burch House, Hodgenville, Kentucky, listed on the National Register of Historic Places (NRHP)
- William Burch House, Fredericktown, Ohio, listed on the NRHP

== See also ==
- Birch House (disambiguation)
