= Sommerer House =

Sommerer House may refer to:

- Sommerer House (South Bend, Indiana)
- John M. and Lillian Sommerer House, Jefferson City, Missouri
- Lansdown-Higgins House, Jefferson City, Missouri, also known as the Sommerer House
