= Birch House =

Birch House may refer to:

- Birch House (Falls Church, Virginia)
- Birch Island House, in Somerset County, Maine
- Annie Birch House, Hoytsville, Utah, listed on the National Register of Historic Places
- W. Taylor Birch House, Washington, D.C., designed by Thomas Franklin Schneider
- Caccia Birch House, in New Zealand

== See also ==
- Burch House (disambiguation)
