= Thomas House (Fourmile Hill, Arkansas) =

Historic house in Arkansas, United States

- U.S. National Register of Historic Places
- Location within Arkansas Location within the United States
- Nearest city: Fourmile Hill, Arkansas
- Coordinates: 35°18′23″N 91°47′17″W
- Area: less than one acre
- Built: 1905
- Architectural style: Vernacular T-shaped
- MPS: White County MPS
- NRHP reference No.: 91001326
- Added to NRHP: July 23, 1992

The Thomas House is a historic house in rural White County, Arkansas. It is located northwest of Searcy, set well back on the west side of Baugh Road between Panther Creek and Smith Roads, sheltered by a copse of trees. It is a single story wood-frame structure, with T-shaped plan topped by a gabled roof, an exterior of novelty siding, and a foundation of brick piers. A porch extends across part of its east side, its shed roof supported by square posts. It was built about 1905, and is one of the county's best-preserved rural houses of the period.

The house was listed on the National Register of Historic Places in 1992.

== See also ==
- National Register of Historic Places listings in White County, Arkansas
