= Jefferson Landing State Historic Site =

State park in the U.S. state of Missouri

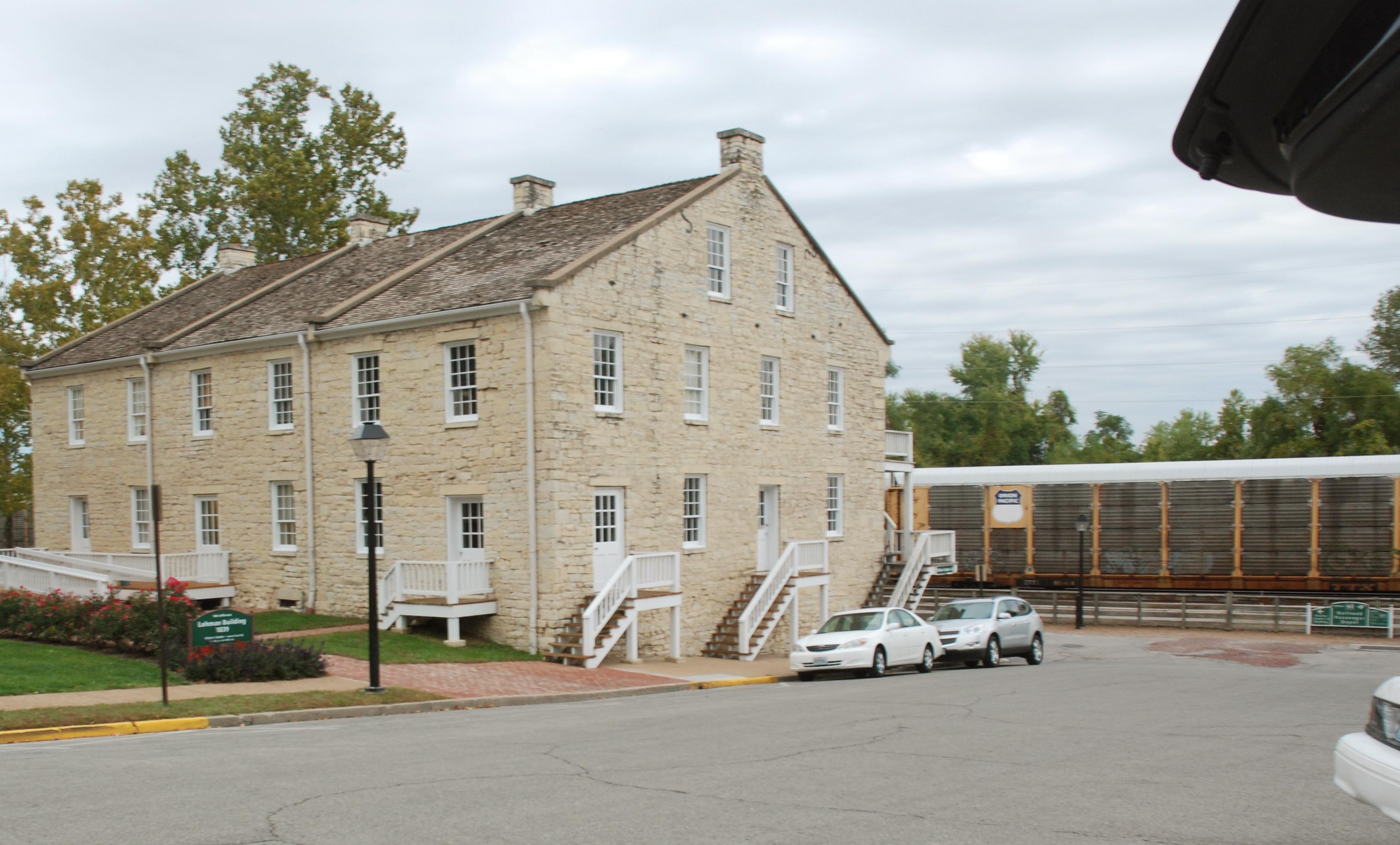
- The Lohman Building

- Location within Missouri Location within the United States
- Location: Jefferson City, Cole County, Missouri, United States
- Coordinates: 38°34′44″N 92°10′14″W
- Area: 1.27 acres (0.51 ha)
- Elevation: 535 ft (163 m)
- Established: 1976
- Governing body: Missouri Department of Natural Resources
- Website: Jefferson Landing State Historic Site

Jefferson Landing State Historic Site is a historic district maintained by the Missouri Department of Natural Resources encompassing several state-owned properties in Jefferson City, Missouri, United States. The historic site includes the Christopher Maus House, the Union Hotel, and the Lohman's Landing Building (also known as the Jefferson Landing Building), which was listed on the National Register of Historic Places in 1969.

== History ==
The stone Lohman Building was constructed in 1839 by James Crump and saw use as a grocery store, warehouse, telegraph office, tavern, and hotel. The building earned the nickname "the landing" and was recognized as a popular meeting place for lawmakers and commercial operators. Crump's business partner Charles Lohman eventually purchased all sections of the building that then became known as Lohman's Landing. In 1855, Charles Maus built a hotel across the street, and his brother Christopher Maus built a small, red brick home just to the south of the hotel. The hotel went through several name changes: Missouri Hotel, Veranda Hotel, and finally the Union Hotel following the Civil War.

The Lohman and Union Hotel buildings came to be used for storage, tenement lodgings, and a shoe factory before being acquired by the state in 1976. The buildings were restored as the state's contribution to the nation's 1976 bicentennial celebration.

== Activities and amenities ==
Exhibits in the Lohman Building depict an 1850s general store and warehouse. The Elizabeth Rozier Gallery, located in the Union Hotel building, offers exhibits on state history, art, and culture. The ground floor of the former hotel also houses the city's Amtrak train station.
