= Zion Lutheran Church (Cole County, Missouri) =

Historic church in Missouri, United States

- U.S. National Register of Historic Places
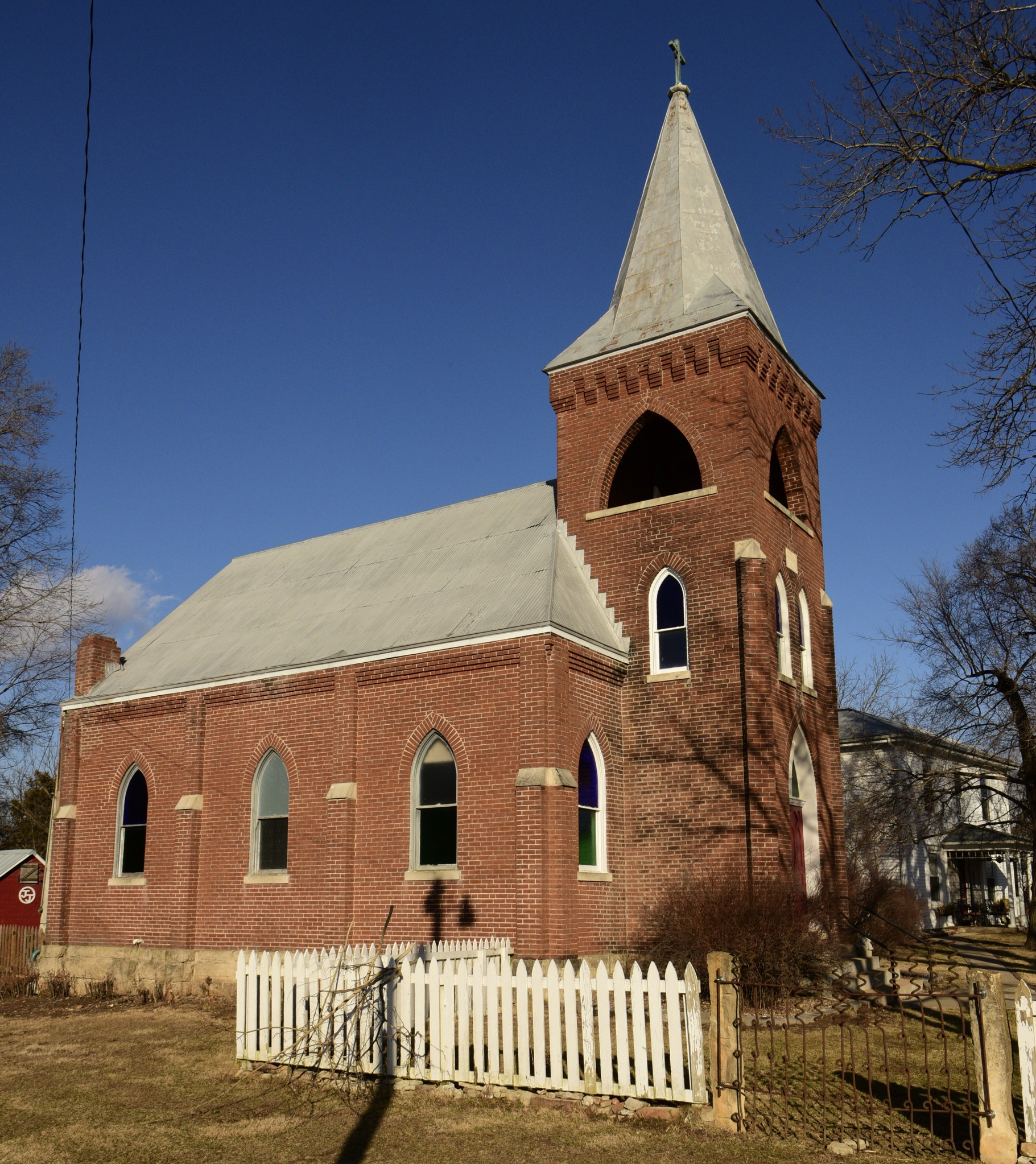

- Location within Missouri Location within the United States
- Location: 2346 Zion Rd., Jefferson City, Missouri
- Coordinates: 38°32′10″N 92°15′11″W
- Area: less than one acre
- Built: 1906
- Architectural style: Late Gothic Revival
- NRHP reference No.: 00001374
- Added to NRHP: November 15, 2000

Zion Lutheran Church is a historic Lutheran church located near Jefferson City, Cole County, Missouri. It was built in 1906, and is a one-story Gothic Revival building constructed of brick with a limestone foundation. It features a three-story front tower with a spire and a polygonal apse in the rear.

It was listed on the National Register of Historic Places in 2000.
