= Hugh and Bessie Stephens House =

Historic house in Missouri, United States

- U.S. National Register of Historic Places
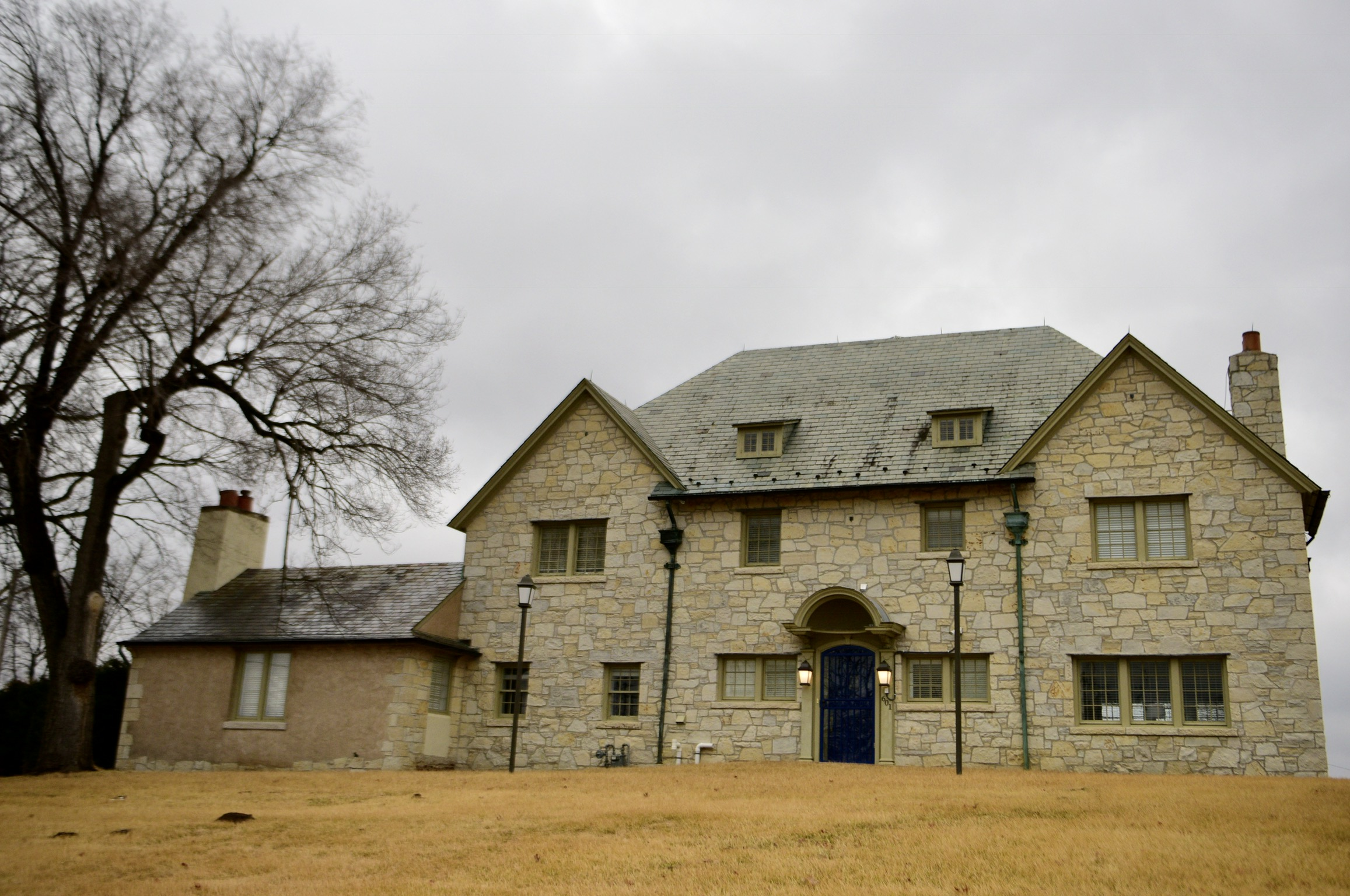

- Location within Missouri Location within the United States
- Location: 601 Jackson St., Jefferson City, Missouri
- Coordinates: 38°34′11″N 92°10′13″W
- Area: 1.6 acres (0.65 ha)
- Built: 1913-1918
- Architect: Evart Tracy, Egerton Swartout
- Architectural style: Late 19th And 20th Century Revivals
- NRHP reference No.: 09000301
- Added to NRHP: May 12, 2009

Hugh and Bessie Stephens House, also known as the Lincoln University President's Residence, is a historic home located in Jefferson City, Cole County, Missouri. It was designed by the architectural firm Tracy and Swartwout and built in 1913. It is a 2 1/2-story, French Eclectic style stone-clad dwelling. It has a one-story wing and steeply pitched hipped roof with front facing cross gables on either corner. Also on the property are the contributing hipped roof stone-clad garage and retaining wall connected to a square stone gazebo. The house has served as the Lincoln University President's residence since 1965.

It was listed on the National Register of Historic Places in 2009.
