= Broadway–Dunklin Historic District =

Historic district in Missouri, United States

- U.S. National Register of Historic Places
- U.S. Historic district
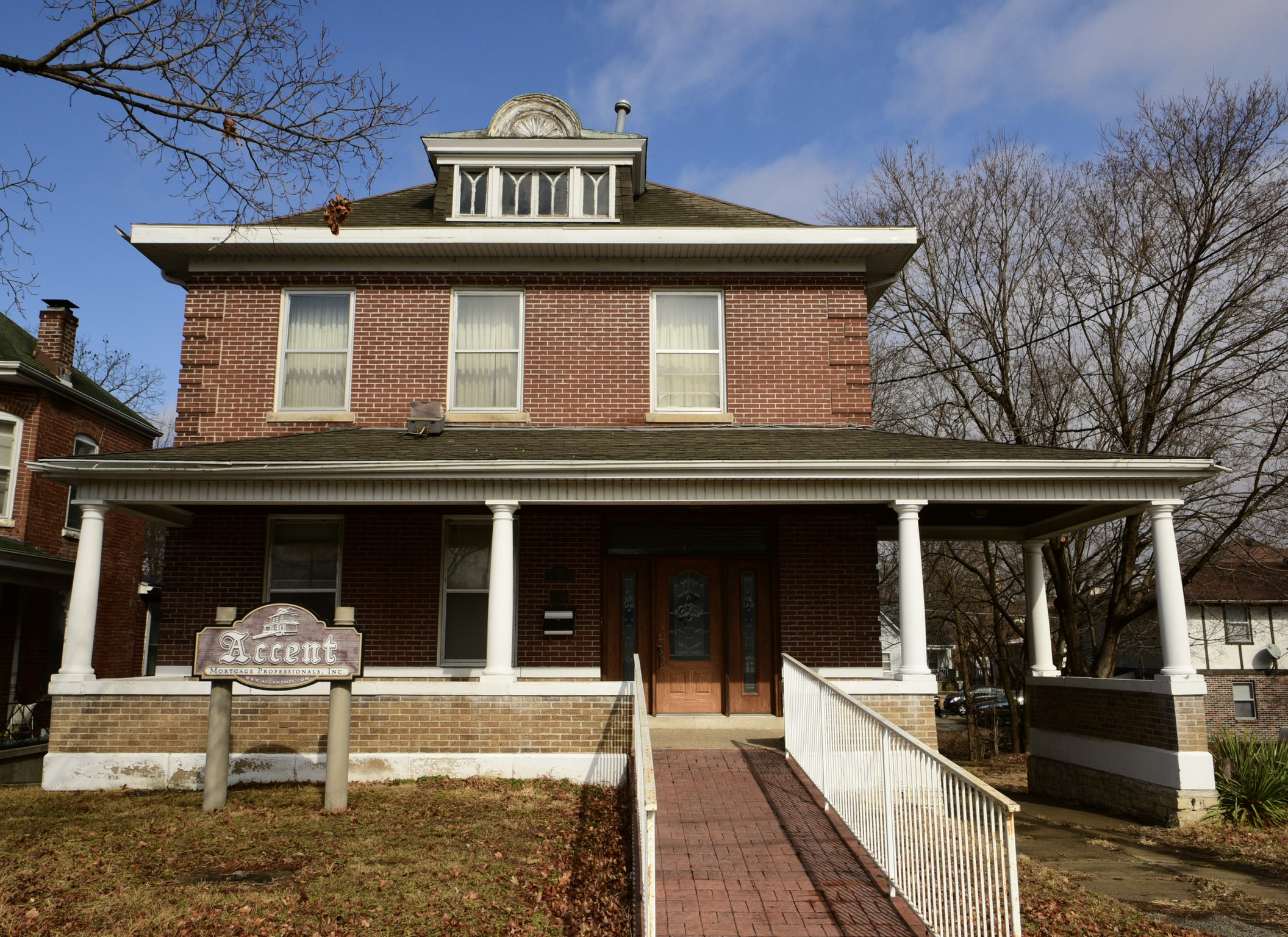
- Carl F. and Elizabeth Deep House

- Location within Missouri Location within the United States
- Location: Most of 600 Blk of Broadway, and the 200 and 300 Blocks of West Dunklin St., Jefferson City, Missouri
- Coordinates: 38°34′30″N 92°10′44″W
- Area: 3 acres (1.2 ha)
- Architect: Miller and Opel
- Architectural style: Queen Anne, Missouri-German
- MPS: Southside Munichburg, Missouri MPS
- NRHP reference No.: 02001300
- Added to NRHP: November 14, 2002

Broadway–Dunklin Historic District is a national historic district located in Jefferson City, Cole County, Missouri. It encompasses 23 contributing buildings in a predominantly residential area. The district developed between about 1885 and 1915 and includes representative examples of Classical Revival, Late Victorian, and Colonial Revival style architecture. Notable buildings include the former Broadway School (1904).

It was listed on the National Register of Historic Places in 2002.
