= Dulle Farmstead Historic District =

Historic district in Missouri, United States

- U.S. National Register of Historic Places
- U.S. Historic district
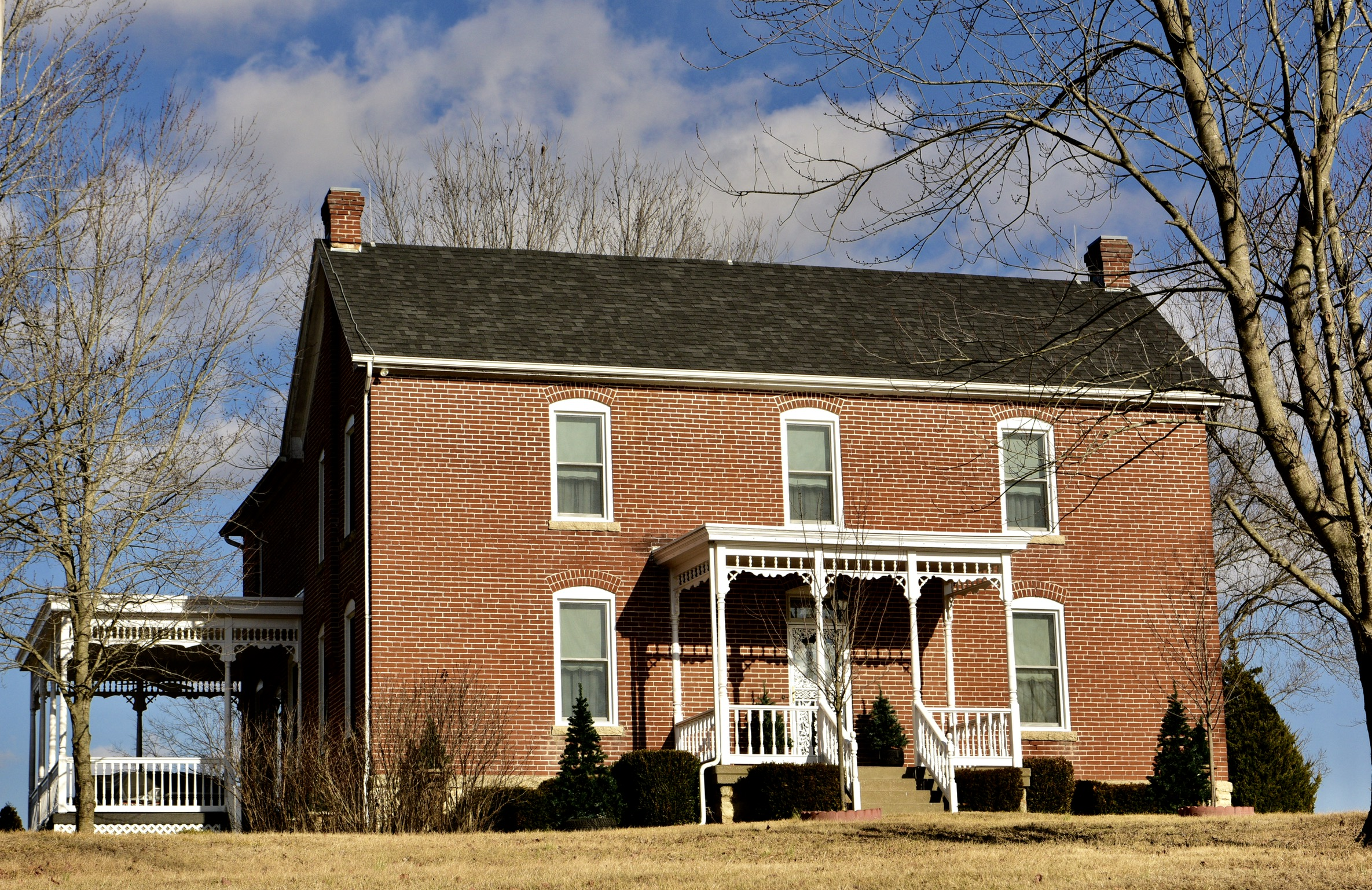

- Location within Missouri Location within the United States
- Location: 1101 Hwy. 54 W., Jefferson City, Missouri
- Coordinates: 38.523647°N 92.226157°W
- Area: 206 acres (83 ha)
- Built: 1858
- Architectural style: I-House
- NRHP reference No.: 93001468
- Added to NRHP: December 30, 1993

Dulle Farmstead Historic District, also known as Pleasant Home Farm, is a historic home and farm and national historic district located near Jefferson City, Cole County, Missouri. It encompasses nine contributing buildings and one contributing structure and include the brick I-house form farmhouse (1902), the multi-purpose barn (c. 1858), the cattle barn (1933), the ice house (c. 1925), the garage (1942), two chicken shelters (c. 1942), two brooder houses (c. 1942), and an oak plank and iron beam bridge (1934).

It was listed on the National Register of Historic Places in 1993.
