= West End Saloon =

- U.S. National Register of Historic Places
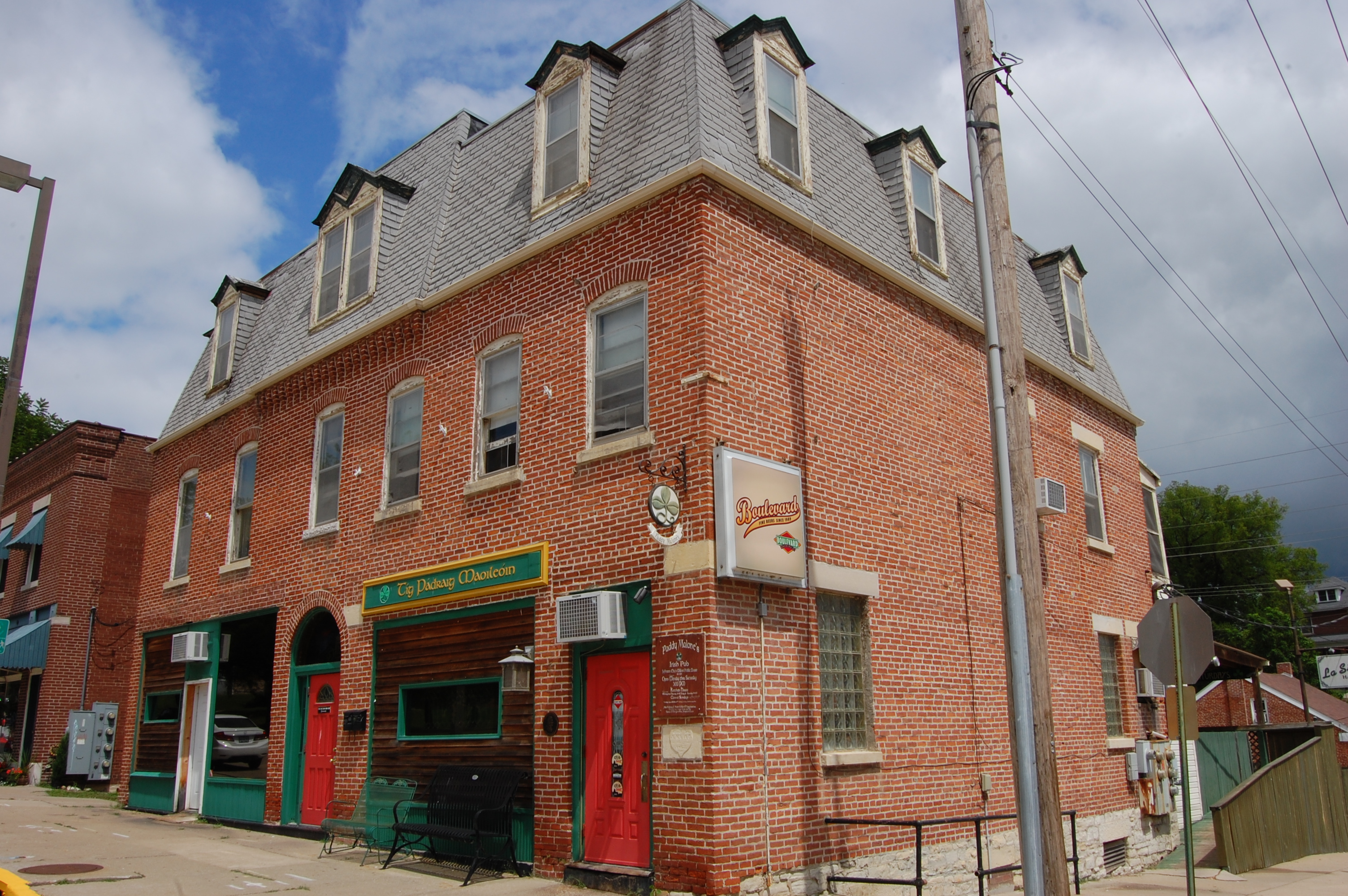
- West End Saloon building, August 2014

- Location within Missouri Location within the United States
- Location: 900 and 902 E. High St., Jefferson City, Missouri
- Coordinates: 38°35′01″N 92°10′45″W
- Area: less than one acre
- Built: 1863, 1892-1898
- NRHP reference No.: 14000374
- Added to NRHP: June 27, 2014

West End Saloon, also known as Paddy Malone's, is a historic commercial building located at Jefferson City, Cole County, Missouri. It was built in 1863, and expanded and enlarged between 1892 and 1898. It is a three-story, rectangular, Second Empire style brick building. It features a mansard roof.

It was listed on the National Register of Historic Places in 2014.
