= Dr. Joseph P. and Effie Porth House =

Historic house in Missouri, United States

- U.S. National Register of Historic Places
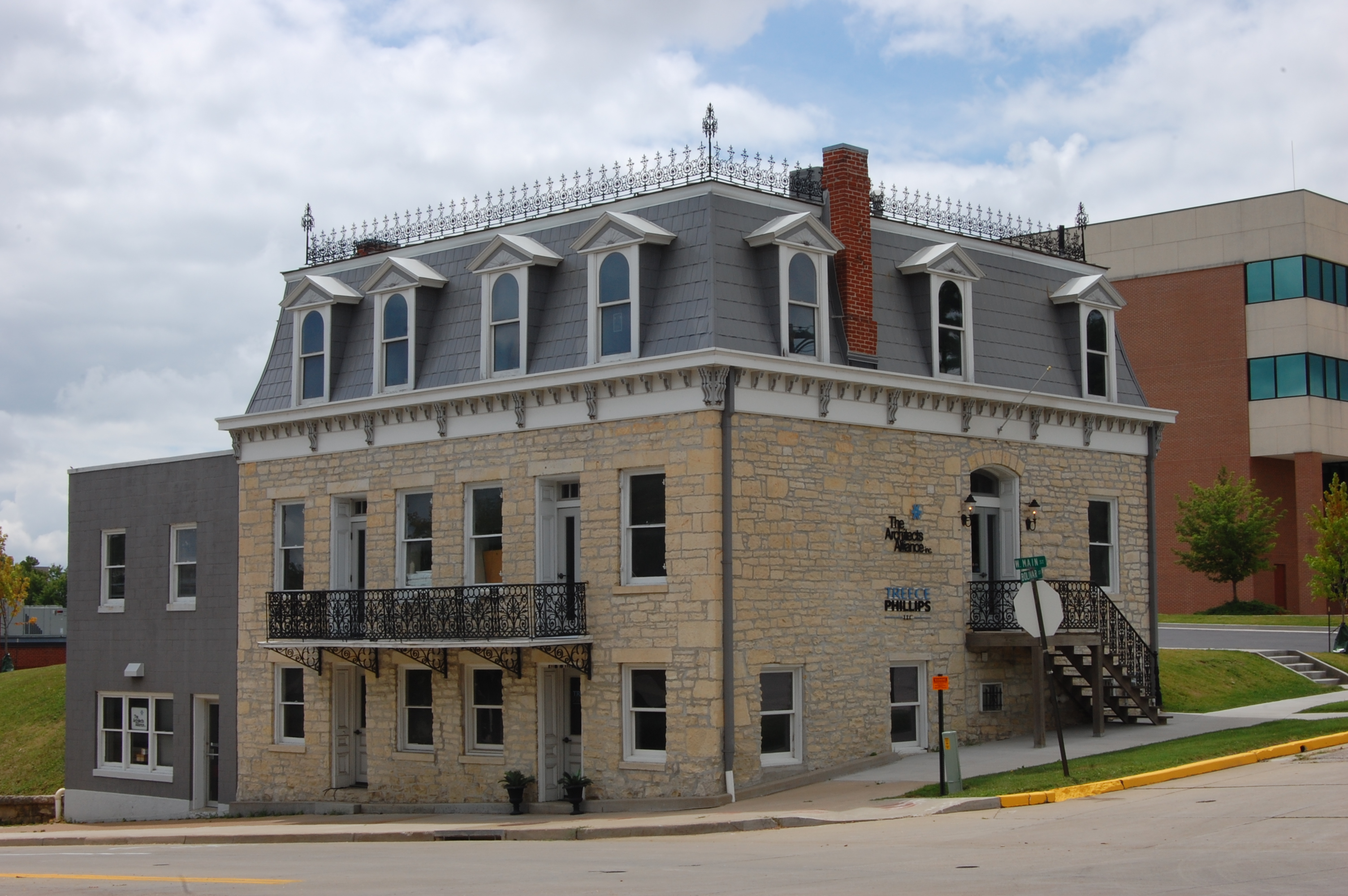
- Porth House, August 2014

- Location within Missouri Location within the United States
- Interactive map showing the location for Dr. Joseph P. and Effie Porth House
- Location: 631 W. Main St., Jefferson City, Missouri
- Coordinates: 38°35′0″N 92°10′43″W
- Area: less than one acre
- Built: c. 1827-1842, c. 1885-1888
- Architectural style: Second Empire
- NRHP reference No.: 01000009
- Added to NRHP: January 26, 2001

Dr. Joseph P. and Effie Porth House, also known as the William Porth House and Colonial Tea Room, is a historic home located at Jefferson City, Cole County, Missouri. The original building was built between 1827 and 1842, and the mansard roof was added between 1885 and 1888. It is a square two-story limestone house with partial walkout basement on the front facade. It features a bracketed cornice and an iron balcony between the basement and first floor. The house became a restaurant known as the Colonial Tea Room in the 1930s before it was sold to the Jefferson City Housing Authority in 1970.

It was listed on the National Register of Historic Places in 2001.
