= Joseph and Elizabeth Wallendorf House =

Historic house in Missouri, United States

- U.S. National Register of Historic Places
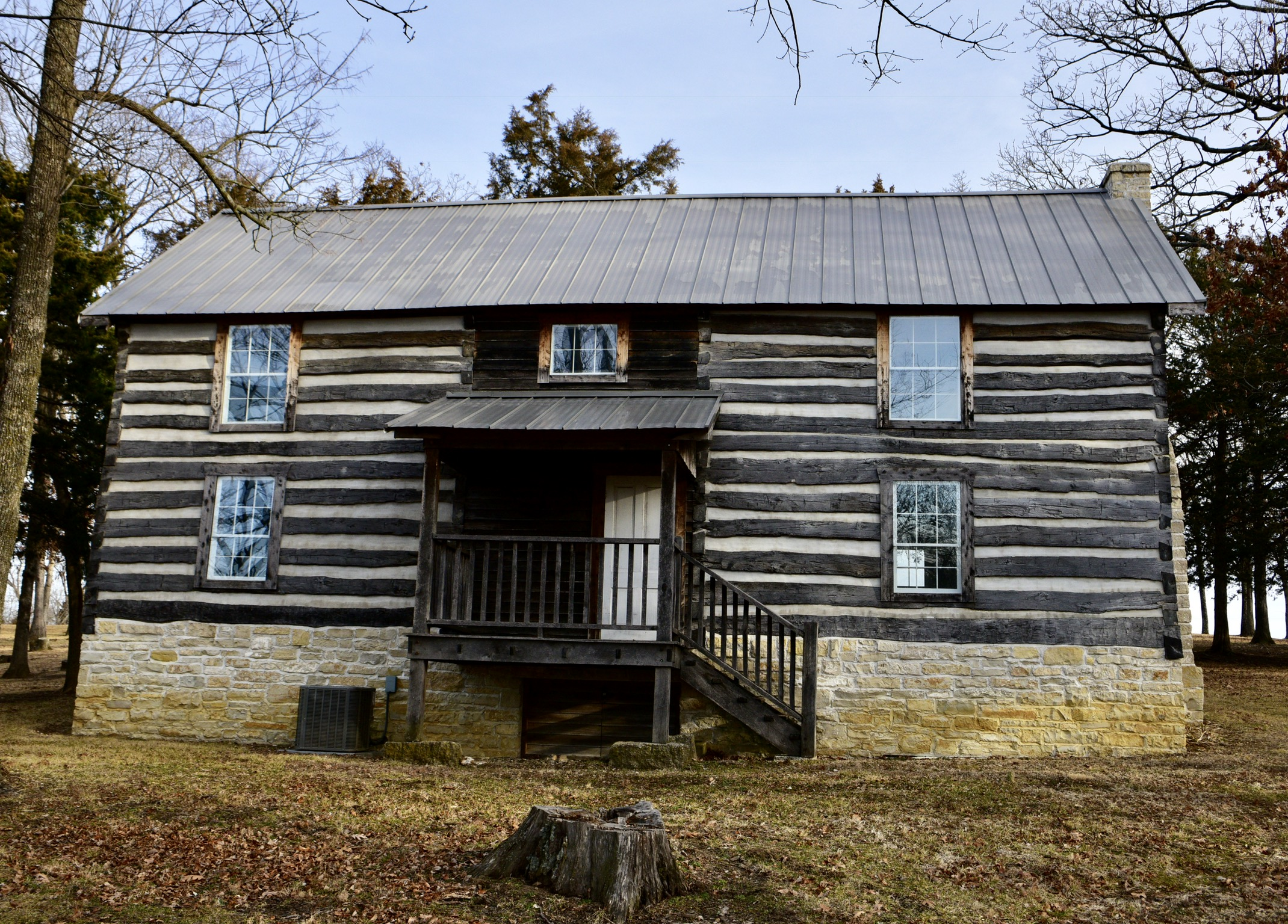

- Location within Missouri Location within the United States
- Location: 701 S. Country Club Dr. Jefferson City, Missouri
- Coordinates: 38°34′50″N 92°15′32″W
- Area: less than one acre
- Built: c. 1830
- Architectural style: 2-story log dogtrot
- NRHP reference No.: 08000253
- Added to NRHP: April 4, 2008

Joseph and Elizabeth Wallendorf House is a historic home located at Jefferson City, Cole County, Missouri. It was built about 1830, and is a two-story enclosed dogtrot style horizontal log house on a stone foundation. The house was moved to its present location in 2004 and restored in 2005.

It was listed on the National Register of Historic Places in 2008.
