= Moreau Park Historic District =

Historic district in Missouri, United States

- U.S. National Register of Historic Places
- U.S. Historic district
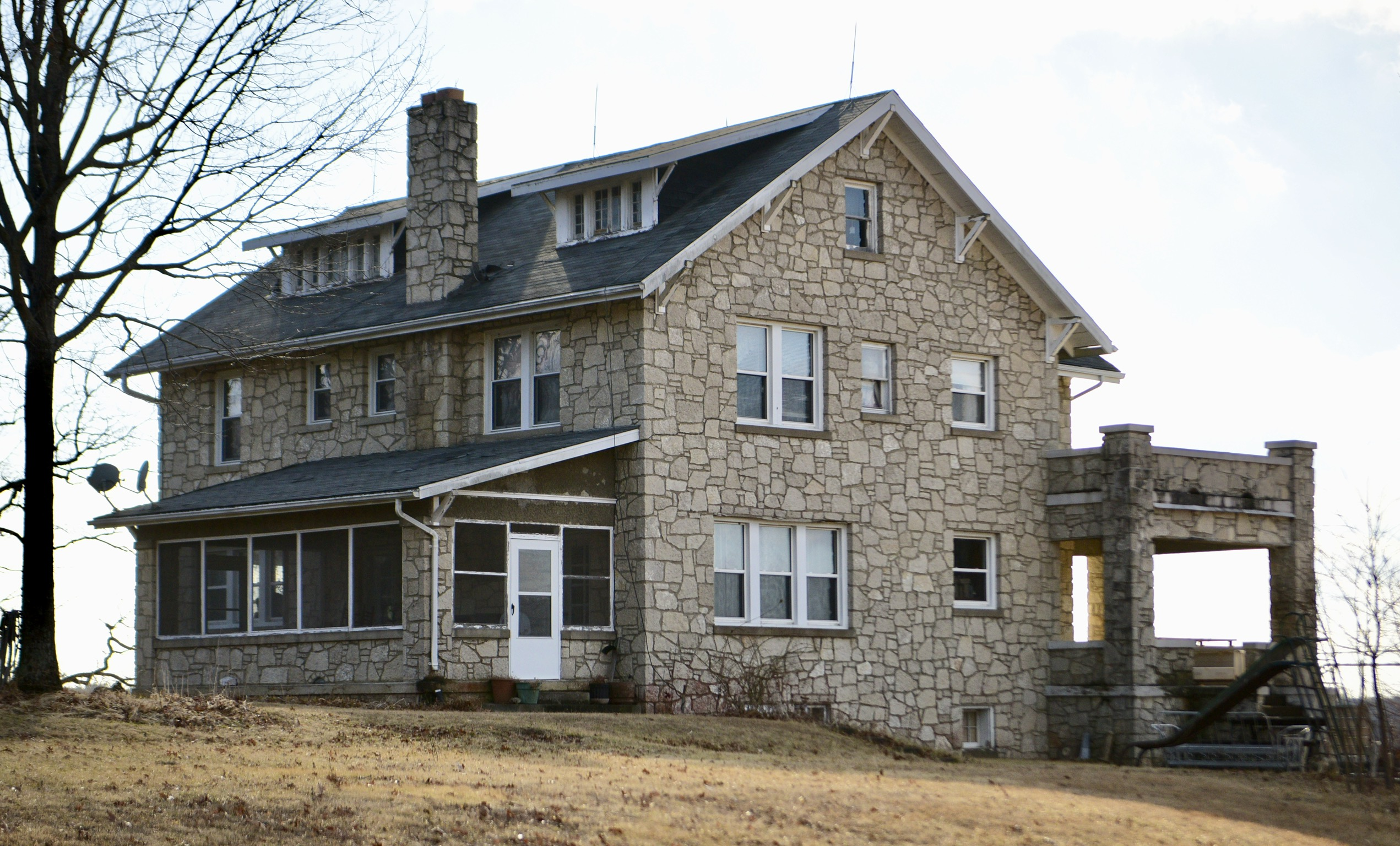
- Dallmeyer House

- Location within Missouri Location within the United States
- Location: 3714 Wardsville Rd., Jefferson City, Missouri
- Coordinates: 38°31′46″N 92°09′52″W
- Area: 30 acres (12 ha)
- Architects: Goldammer, William
- Architectural style: Late 19th And Early 20th Century American Movements
- NRHP reference No.: 09000786
- Added to NRHP: September 30, 2009

Moreau Park Historic District is a national historic district located near Jefferson City, Cole County, Missouri.

It encompasses seven contributing buildings, one contributing site, and five contributing structures associated with a former resort along the Moreau River near Jefferson City. The district developed between about 1914 and 1950, and includes some historic landscaping features (including 100 stone steps), the native stone Dallmeyer House (c. 1924), Moreau Lodge (1914), one remaining guest cabin, two stone outbuildings, a privy, barn, and concession stand.

It was listed on the National Register of Historic Places in 2009.
