= Gay Archeological Site =

- U.S. National Register of Historic Places
- Nearest city: Osage City, Missouri
- Area: 32 acres (13 ha)
- NRHP reference No.: 71000466
- Added to NRHP: January 25, 1971

Gay Archeological Site is a historic archaeological site located at Osage City, Cole County, Missouri. The Gay Archaeological Site contains examples of Late Woodland period mound and fortification groupings.

It was listed on the National Register of Historic Places in 1971.
