= East End Drugs =

- U.S. National Register of Historic Places
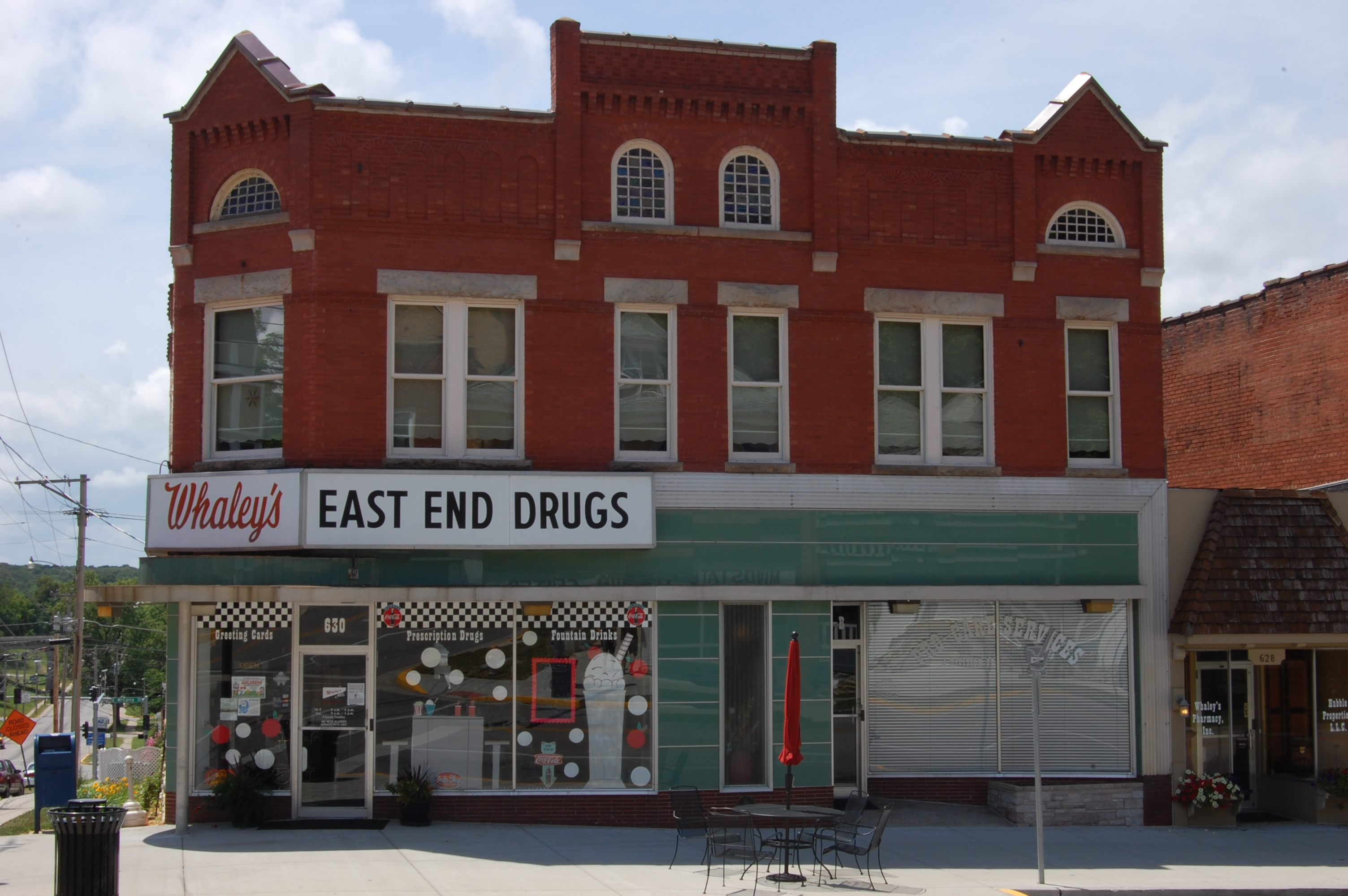
- East End Drugs, August 2014

- Location within Missouri Location within the United States
- Interactive map showing the location for East End Drugs
- Location: 630 E. High St., Jefferson City, Missouri
- Coordinates: 38°34′18″N 92°9′52″W
- Area: less than one acre
- Built: 1892-1898
- Architectural style: Romanesque
- NRHP reference No.: 03000794
- Added to NRHP: August 21, 2003

East End Drugs is a historic commercial building located at Jefferson City, Cole County, Missouri. It was built between 1892 and 1898, and is a two-story, Romanesque Revival style brick two-part commercial block. It features a corner entrance, as well as a highly detailed cornice and attic level windows. It has two individual storefronts on the first floor, and two apartments upstairs behind a single facade.

It was listed on the National Register of Historic Places in 2003.
