= Lohman's Landing Building =

- U.S. National Register of Historic Places
- U.S. Historic district – Contributing property
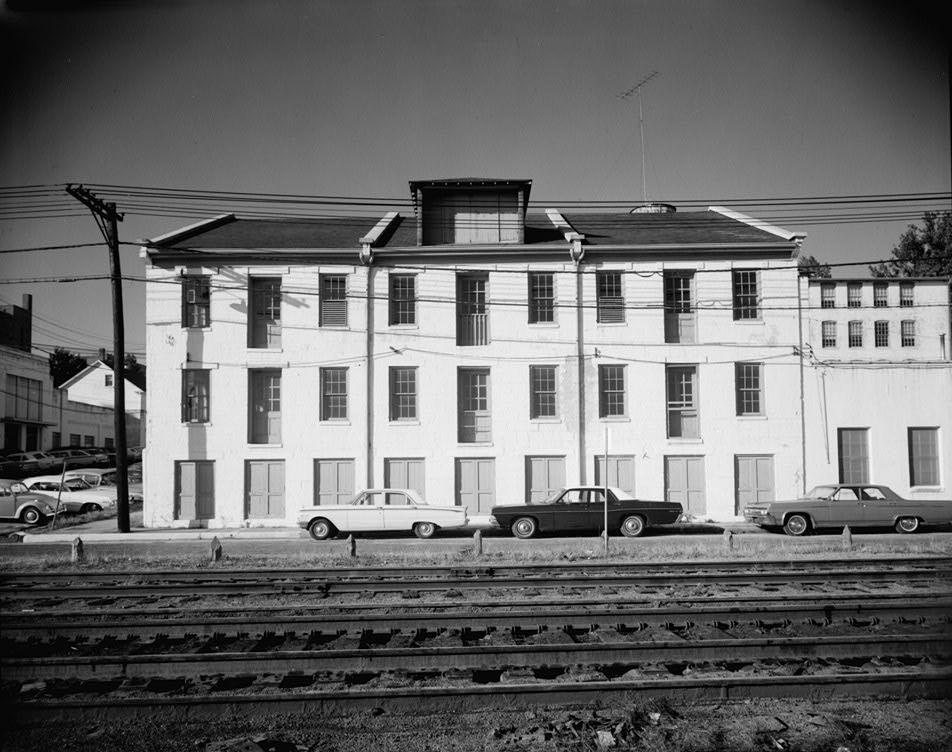
- Lohman's Landing Building, HABS Photo, 1968

- Location within Missouri Location within the United States
- Location: W corner of Jefferson and Water Sts., Jefferson City, Missouri
- Coordinates: 38°34′39″N 92°10′14″W
- Area: less than one acre
- Built: c. 1834
- NRHP reference No.: 69000094
- Added to NRHP: February 25, 1969

The Lohman's Landing Building, also known as the Jefferson Landing Building, is a historic commercial building located in Jefferson Landing State Historic Site at Jefferson City, Cole County, Missouri. It was built about 1834, and is a 3 1/2-story, rectangular limestone building. It measures 71 feet 6 inches in length and 50 feet in depth.

It was listed on the National Register of Historic Places in 1969. It is located in the Missouri State Capitol Historic District.
