= Munichburg Commercial Historic District =

Historic district in Missouri, United States

- U.S. National Register of Historic Places
- U.S. Historic district
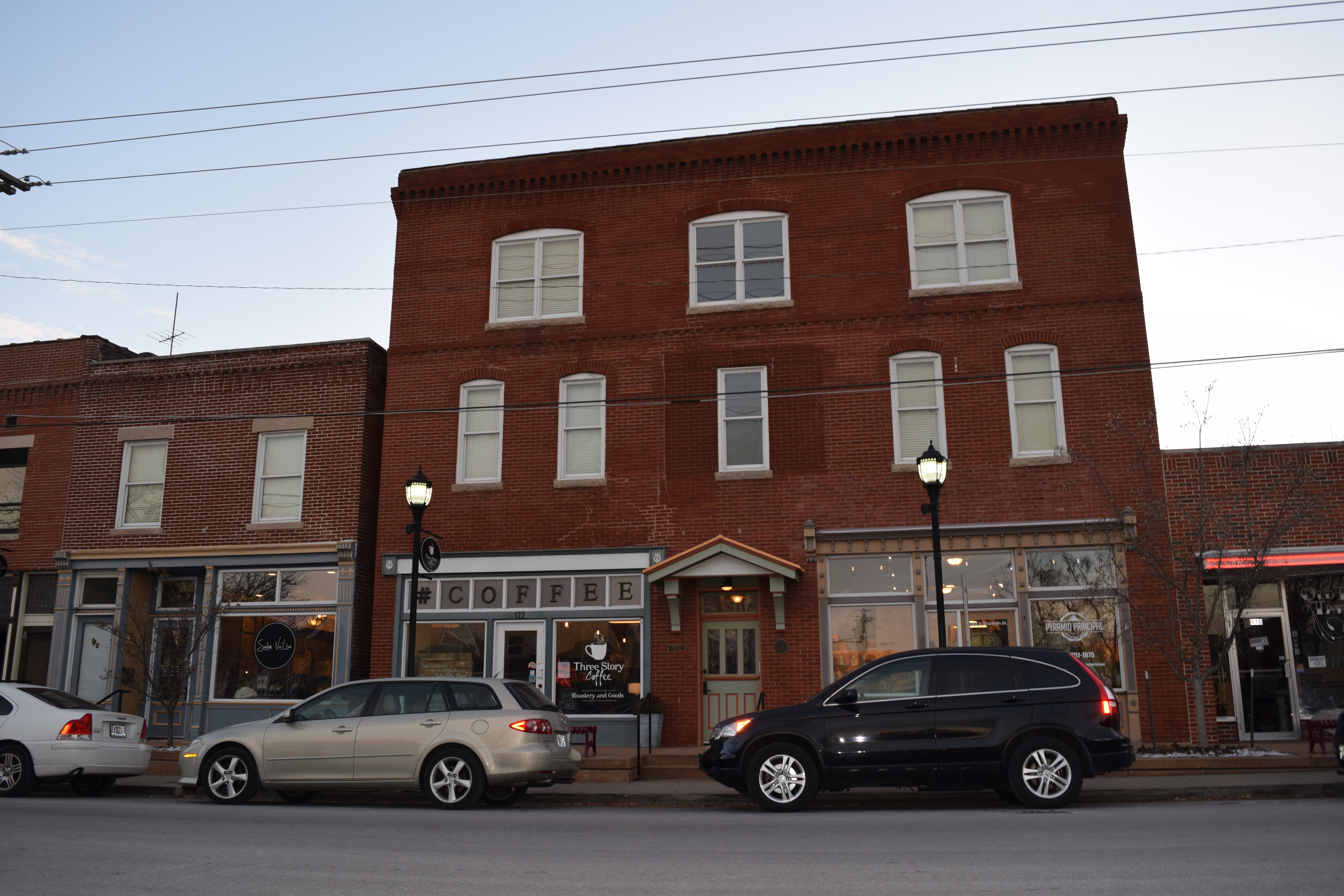
- Nieghorn House Hotel

- Location within Missouri Location within the United States
- Location: 114-130 (even only) E. Dunklin St., 610, 620 Madison St., 704 Madison St., Jefferson City, Missouri
- Coordinates: 38°34′14″N 92°10′29″W
- Area: 1.6 acres (0.65 ha)
- Architect: Wallau, Henry J.
- Architectural style: Early Commercial, One and Two Part Commercial
- MPS: Southside Munichburg, Missouri MPS
- NRHP reference No.: 09000477
- Added to NRHP: July 1, 2009

Munichburg Commercial Historic District is a national historic district located at Jefferson City, Cole County, Missouri. It encompasses nine contributing buildings in Jefferson City. The district developed between about 1892 and 1951, and includes representative examples of Early Commercial and One and Two Part Commercial architecture. Notable buildings include the Nieghorn House Hotel (1892), Southside Barber Shop (c. 1893, 1951), Schmidt Shoe Store (1908), Southside Dry Goods (c. 1918), Milo H. Walz Hardware Store (c. 1924), Milo H. Walz Furniture Store (1936), Henry Schmidt Grocery Store (c. 1908), Central Dairy (c. 1935, 1942), and Busch's Florist (c. 1935).

It was listed on the National Register of Historic Places in 2009.
