= Herman Haar House =

Historic house in Missouri, United States

- U.S. National Register of Historic Places
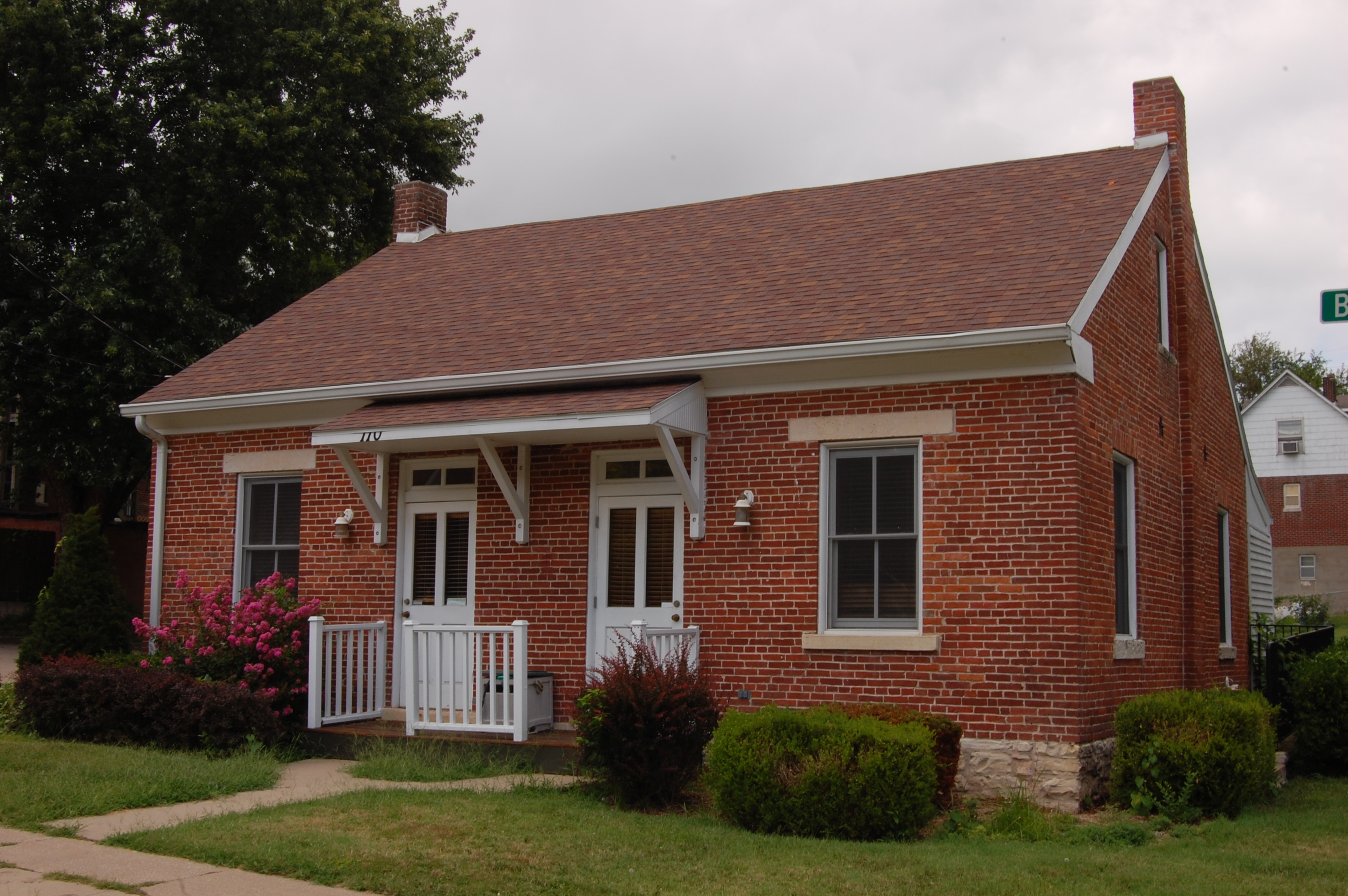
- Herman Haar House, August 2014

- Location within Missouri Location within the United States
- Location: 110 Bolivar St., Jefferson City, Missouri
- Coordinates: 38°35′2″N 92°10′43″W
- Area: less than one acre
- Built: c. 1859
- Built by: Haar, Herman
- Architectural style: Missouri-German
- NRHP reference No.: 97000398
- Added to NRHP: May 2, 1997

Herman Haar House, also known as the Haar-Bergman House and Byrd House, is a historic home located in Jefferson City, Cole County, Missouri. It was built about 1859, and is a 1 1/2-story, four-bay, Missouri-German Vernacular brick dwelling. It has a gable roof and two front doors. It was moved in 1986 to its present location.

It was listed on the National Register of Historic Places in 1997.
