= Charles J. and Clara B. Schmidt House =

Historic house in Missouri, United States

- U.S. National Register of Historic Places
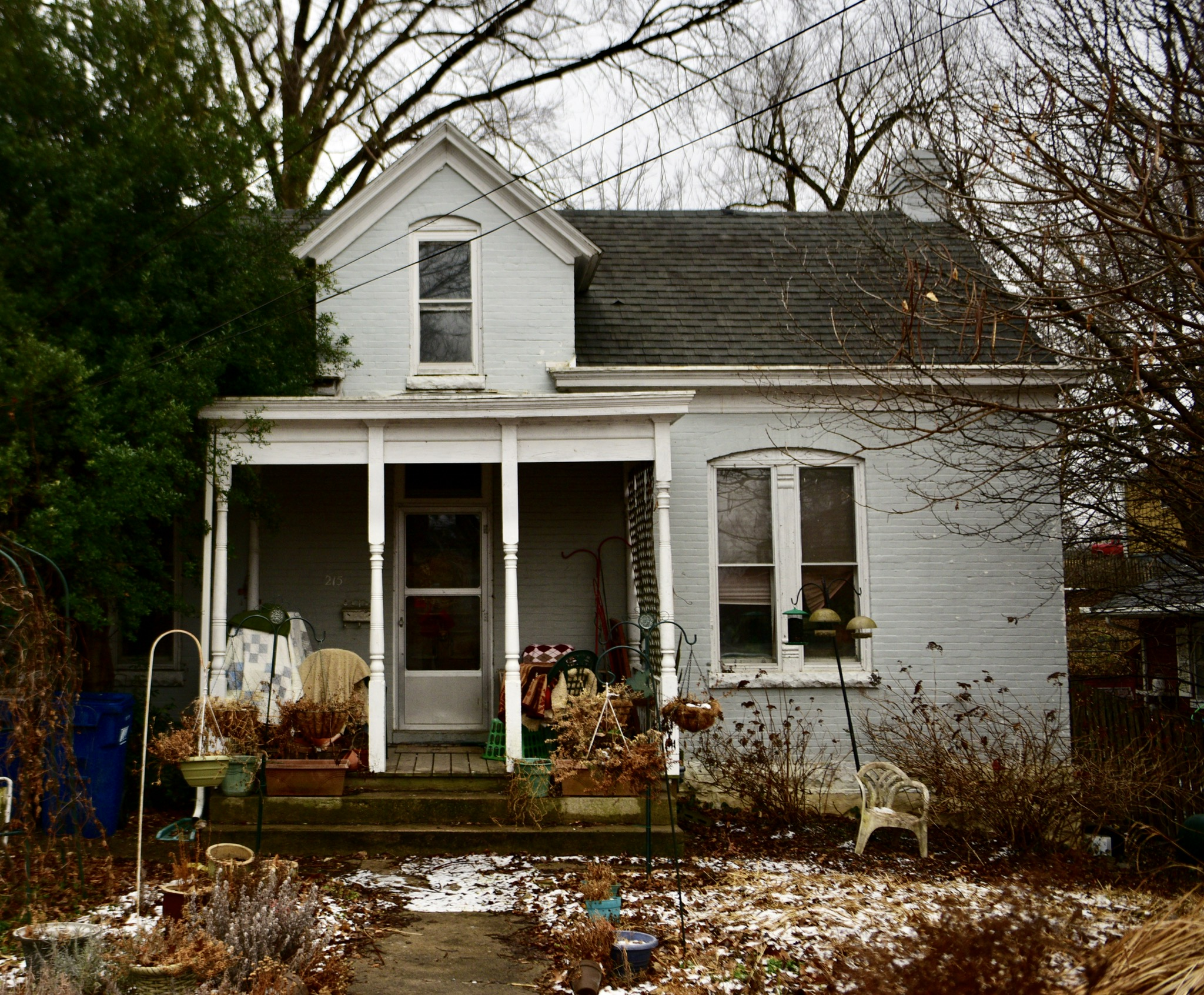

- Location within Missouri Location within the United States
- Location: 215 W. Atchison St., Jefferson City, Missouri
- Coordinates: 38°34′19″N 92°10′53″W
- Area: less than one acre
- Built: c. 1897
- Architectural style: Missouri-German Vernacular
- MPS: Southside Munichburg, Missouri MPS
- NRHP reference No.: 02001303
- Added to NRHP: January 7, 2003

Charles J. and Clara B. Schmidt House is a historic home located in Jefferson City, Cole County, Missouri. It was built about 1897, and is a 1 1/2-story, three-bay, Missouri-German Vernacular brick dwelling. It has a gable roof and features a one-story wooden porch with turned posts.

It was listed on the National Register of Historic Places in 2003.
