= Villa Panorama =

Historic house in Missouri, United States

- U.S. National Register of Historic Places
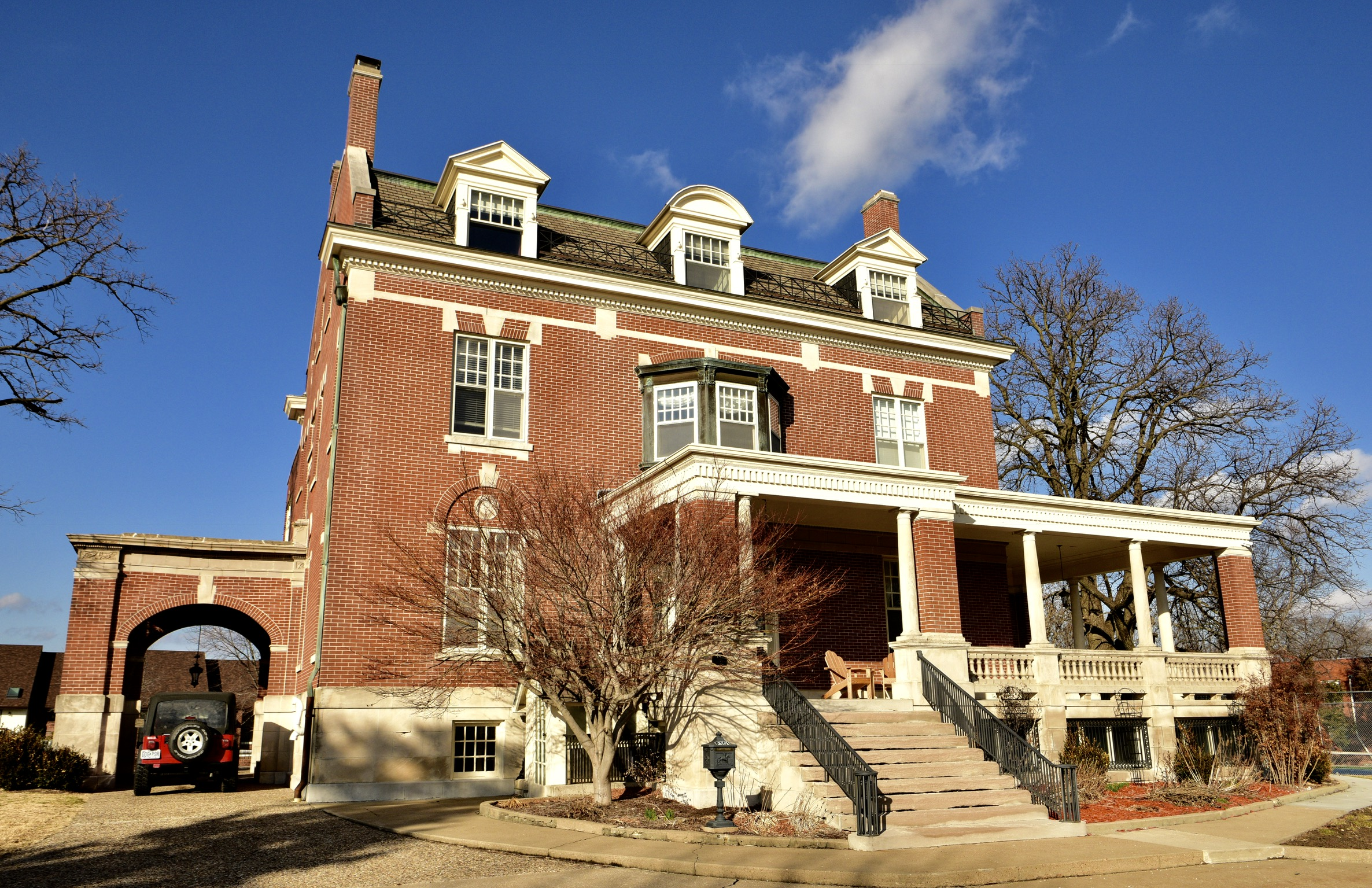

- Location within Missouri Location within the United States
- Location: 1310 Swifts Hwy., Jefferson City, Missouri
- Coordinates: 38°34′9″N 92°11′32″W
- Area: 6 acres (2.4 ha)
- Built: 1907
- Architect: H.J. Wallau
- Architectural style: Colonial Revival
- NRHP reference No.: 85000031
- Added to NRHP: January 3, 1985

Villa Panorama is a historic home located in Jefferson City, Cole County, Missouri. It was built in 1907, and is a 2 1/2-story, Colonial Revival style brick dwelling. It sits on a rough ashlar limestone basement and has a slate gambrel roof with dormers. It features an entrance portico and porte cochere. Also on the property are the contributing brick carriage house, pump house, and landscaped property with stone grotto.

It was listed on the National Register of Historic Places in 1985.
