= Dr. W. T. Bolton House =

Historic house in California, United States

- U.S. National Register of Historic Places
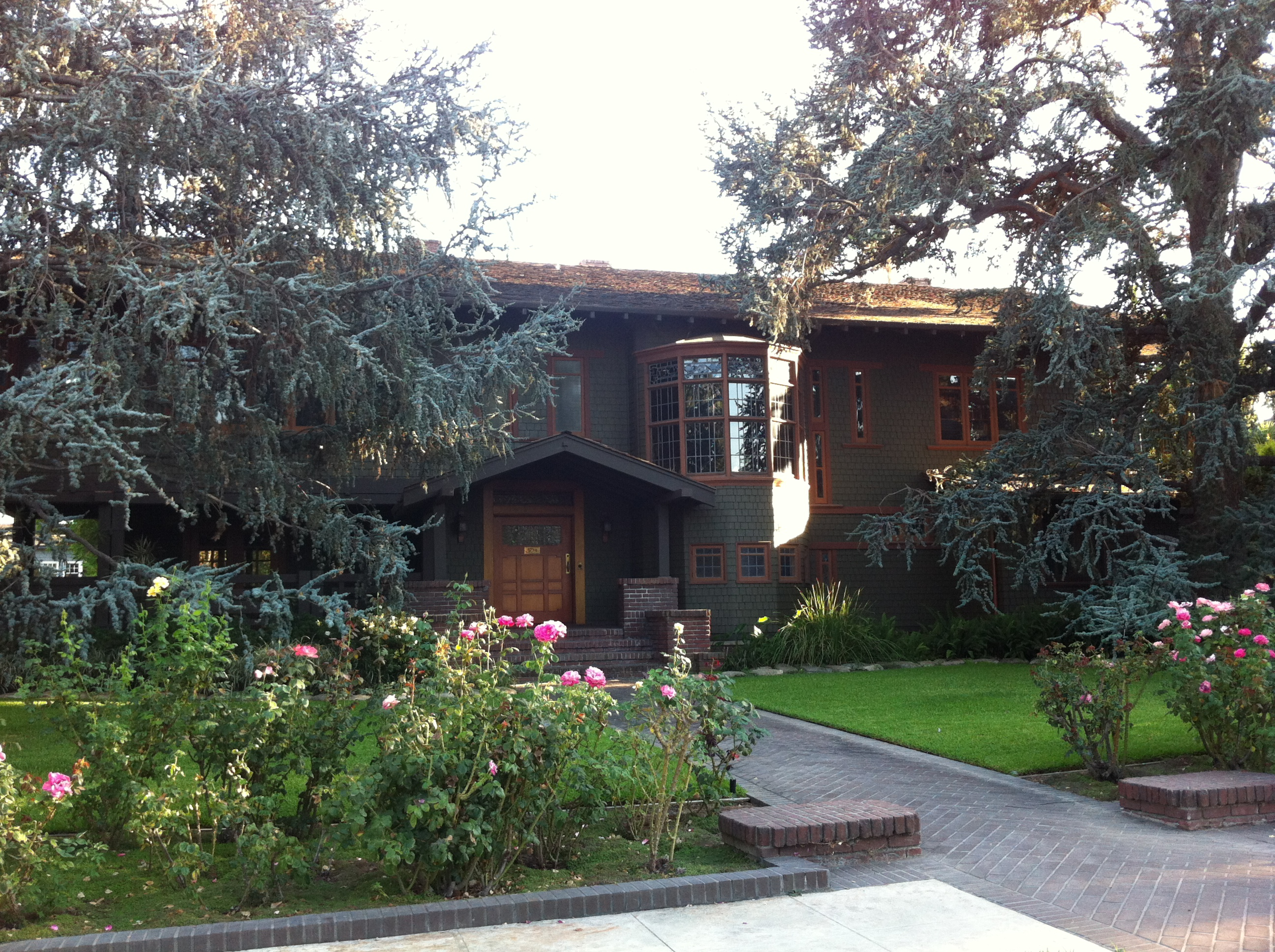

- Location within the Los Angeles metropolitan area Location within California Location within the United States
- Location: 370 W. Del Mar Blvd., Pasadena, California
- Coordinates: 34°8′26″N 118°9′27″W
- Area: 0.4 acres (0.16 ha)
- Built: 1929
- Architect: Charles and Henry Greene
- Architectural style: American Craftsman
- NRHP reference No.: 80004491
- Added to NRHP: July 9, 1980

The Dr. W. T. Bolton House is a historic house located at 370 W. Del Mar Boulevard in Pasadena, California. Built in 1906, the Craftsman-style house was designed by prominent Pasadena architects Charles and Henry Greene. The house's design emphasizes function over form, a key concept in Craftsman designs; its joints and beams are exposed, and the wooden front door was oiled by hand to highlight its natural grain and color. The house's light fixtures, stained glass windows, and even furnishings were also designed by Greene and Greene to give the house a unified design. Dr. W. T. and Alice Bolton commissioned the house, which was their second residence designed by the Greene brothers; while W. T. Bolton died before he could live in the house, Alice Bolton lived there until 1917. The house was one of several Craftsman homes built in Pasadena's "Millionaire's Row" district, which included a number of large homes in the vicinity of Orange Grove Boulevard.

The house was added to the National Register of Historic Places on July 9, 1980.
