= Moreau Drive Historic District =

Historic district in Missouri, United States

- U.S. National Register of Historic Places
- U.S. Historic district
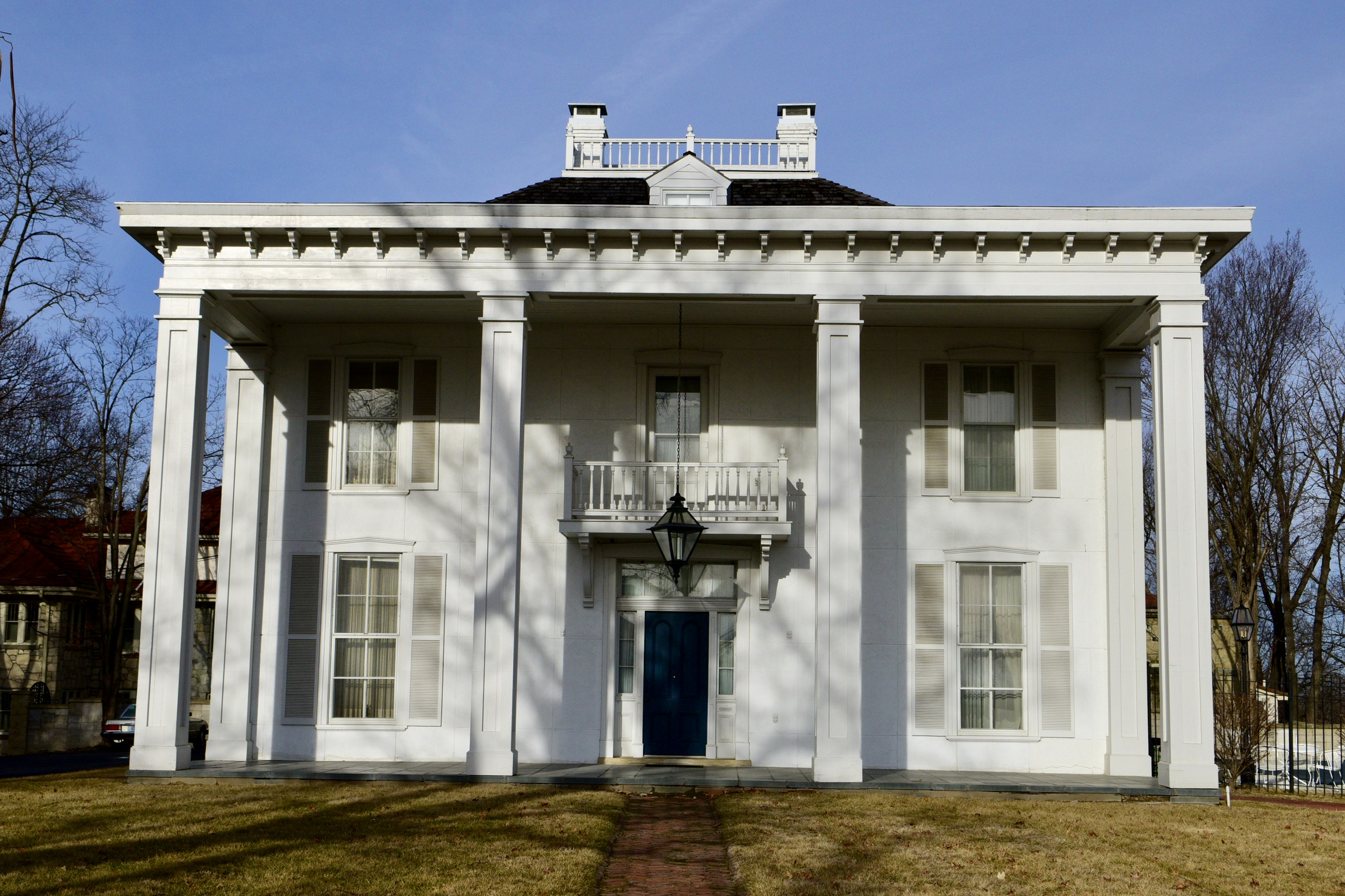
- John C. Edwards House

- Location within Missouri Location within the United States
- Location: Moreau & Elmerine Drs., Fairmount Blvd., Oakwood Ave., Fairmount Ct., Lee St., Moreland Ave., Jefferson City, Missouri
- Coordinates: 38°33′11″N 92°10′08″W
- Area: 95.9 acres (38.8 ha)
- Architect: Hare & Hare; Vineyard, Mayme
- Architectural style: Tudor Revival, Colonial Revival, Bungalow/craftsman, Modern Movement
- NRHP reference No.: 13000907
- Added to NRHP: December 11, 2013

Moreau Drive Historic District is a national historic district located at Jefferson City, Cole County, Missouri. It encompasses 252 contributing buildings and 3 contributing structures in a predominantly residential section of Jefferson City. The district developed between about 1847 and 1950, and includes representative examples of Tudor Revival, Colonial Revival, Bungalow / American Craftsman, and Modern Movement style architecture.

It was listed on the National Register of Historic Places in 2013.
