= Henry and Elizabeth Bockrath House =

Historic house in Missouri, United States

- U.S. National Register of Historic Places
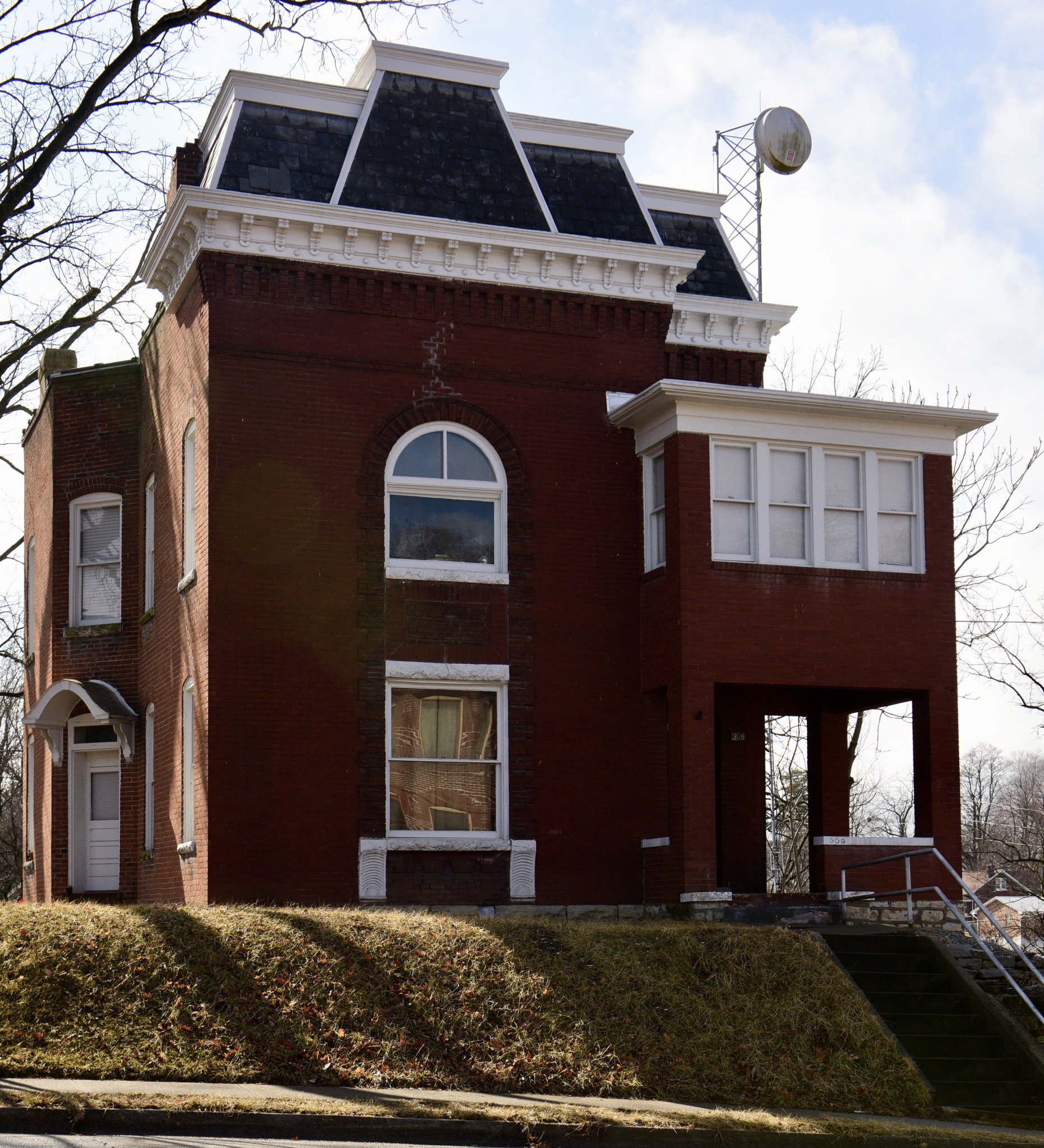

- Location within Missouri Location within the United States
- Location: 309 W. Dunklin St., Jefferson City, Missouri
- Coordinates: 38°34′30″N 92°10′50″W
- Area: Less than 1 acre (0.40 ha)
- Built: c. 1899
- Architectural style: Second Empire
- MPS: Southside Munichburg, Missouri MPS
- NRHP reference No.: 13000190
- Added to NRHP: April 23, 2013

Henry and Elizabeth Bockrath House is a historic home located in Jefferson City, Cole County, Missouri. It was built about 1899, and is a two-story, Second Empire style red brick dwelling. It sits on a limestone foundation and has a slate-covered faux mansard roof. It features a decorative wood bracketed cornice.

It was listed on the National Register of Historic Places in 2013.
