= William E. and Frederica M. Zuendt House =

Historic house in Missouri, United States

- U.S. National Register of Historic Places
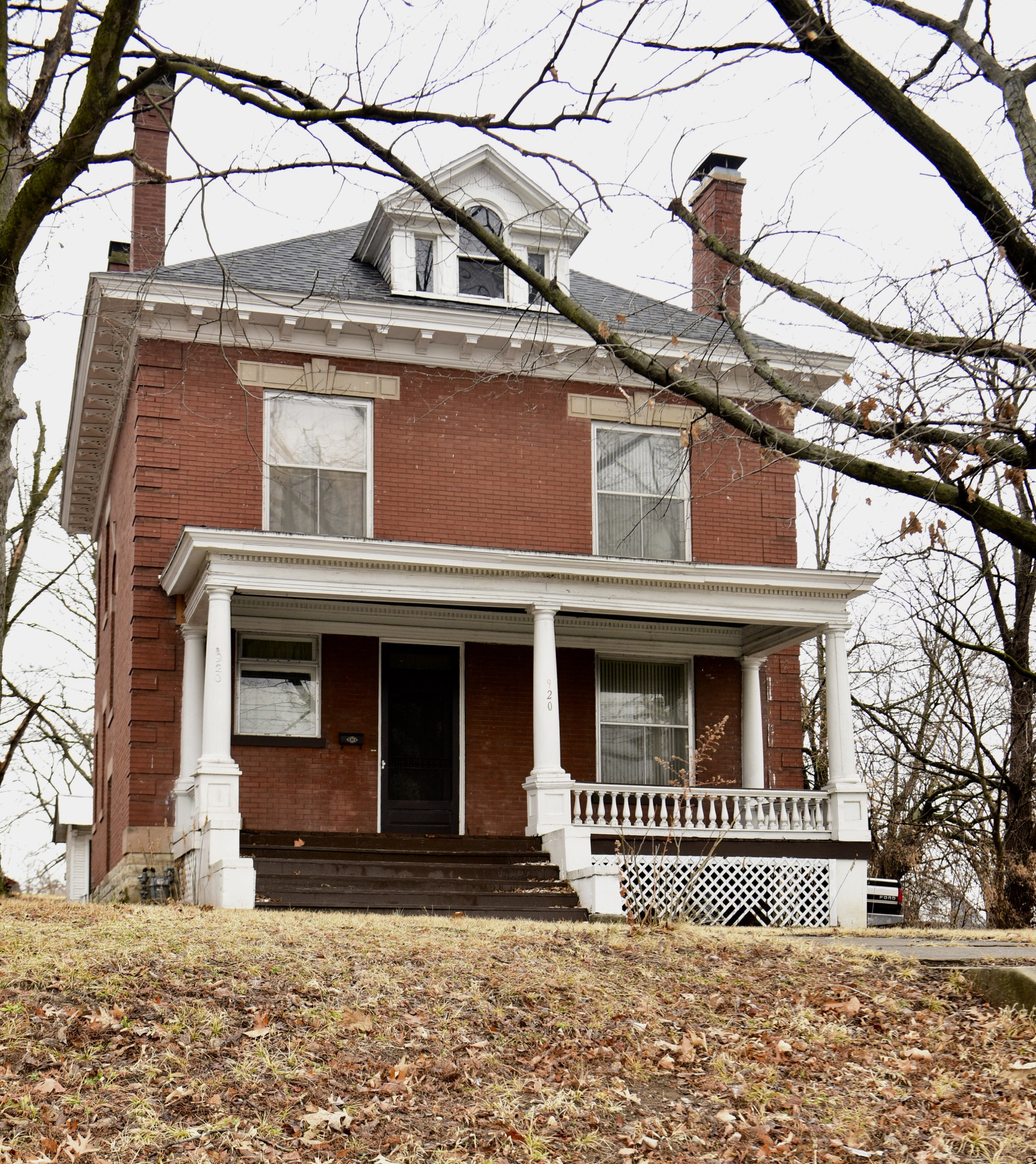

- Location within Missouri Location within the United States
- Location: 920 Jefferson St., Jefferson City, Missouri
- Coordinates: 38°34′15″N 92°10′48″W
- Area: less than one acre
- Built: 1913
- Architectural style: Colonial Revival
- MPS: Southside Munichburg, Missouri MPS
- NRHP reference No.: 02001306
- Added to NRHP: November 15, 2002

William E. and Frederica M. Zuendt House, also known as the Johnson House, is a historic home located in Jefferson City, Cole County, Missouri. It was built in 1913, and is a two-story, three-bay, Colonial Revival style brick dwelling on a stone foundation. It has a slate hipped roof with dormer window. Also on the property is a contributing garage.

It was listed on the National Register of Historic Places in 2002.
