= Osage City, Missouri =

Unincorporated community in Missouri, U.S.

Coordinates: 38°33′09″N 92°01′57″W

Osage City is an unincorporated community in Cole County, in the U.S. state of Missouri.

== History ==
Osage City was platted in 1867. The community took its name from the nearby Osage River. A post office called Osage City was established in 1856, and remained in operation until 1962.

The Gay Archeological Site was listed on the National Register of Historic Places in 2016.
