= John B. and Elizabeth Ruthven House =

Historic house in Missouri, United States

- U.S. National Register of Historic Places
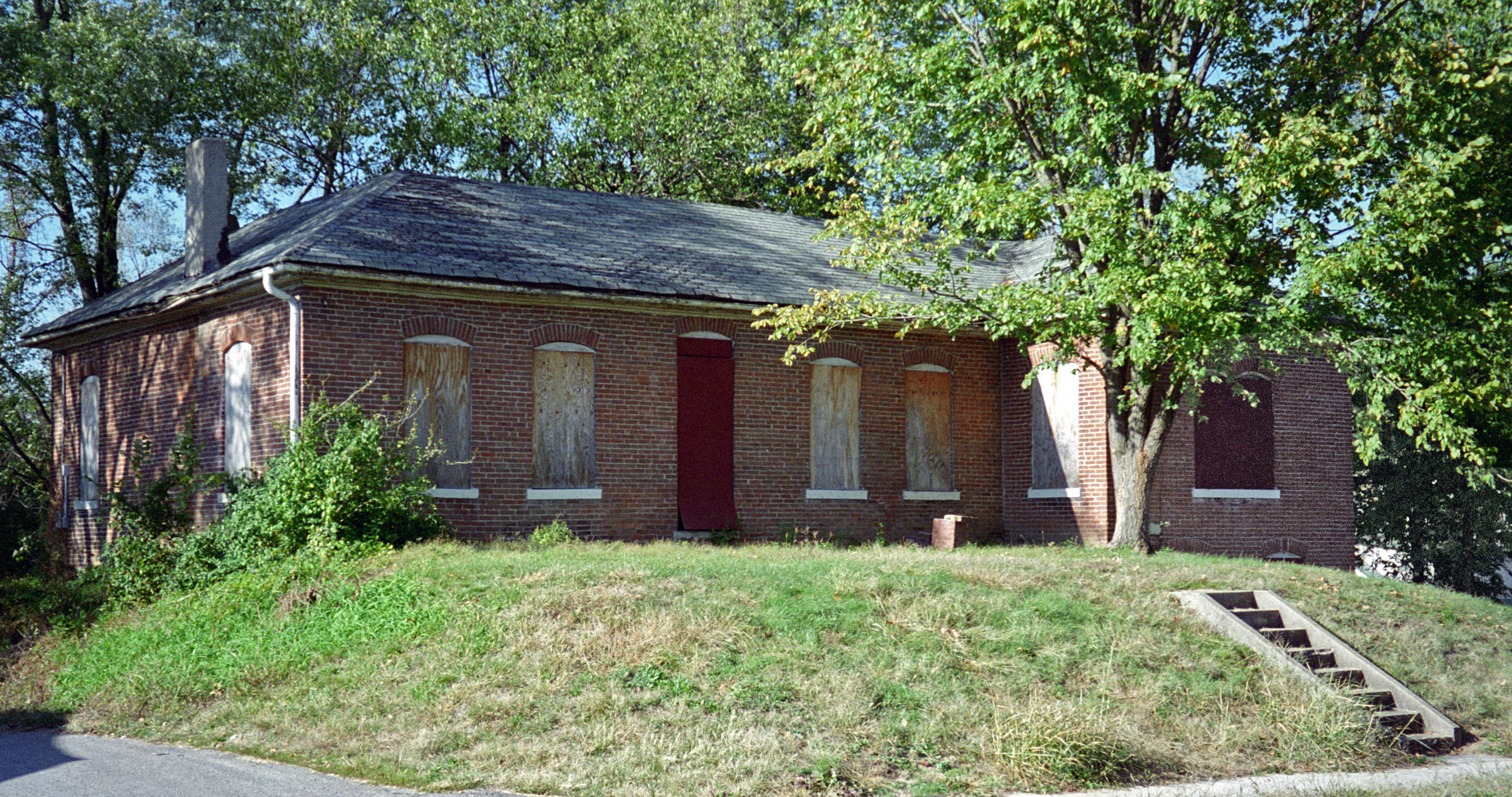

- Location within Missouri Location within the United States
- Location: 406 Cherry St. Jefferson City, Missouri
- Coordinates: 38°34′9″N 92°9′55″W
- Area: less than one acre
- Built: c. 1879
- Architectural style: Missouri German
- NRHP reference No.: 00000537
- Added to NRHP: May 26, 2000

John B. and Elizabeth Ruthven House, also known as the Wehmeyer House and Ruthven-Wehmeyer House, is a historic home located at Jefferson City, Cole County, Missouri. It was built about 1879, and is a one-story, five-bay, Missouri-German Vernacular brick dwelling. It has a hipped roof, arched brick lintels, and an original rear ell.

It was listed on the National Register of Historic Places in 2000.
