= Hobo Hill Historic District =

Historic district in Missouri, United States

- U.S. National Register of Historic Places
- U.S. Historic district
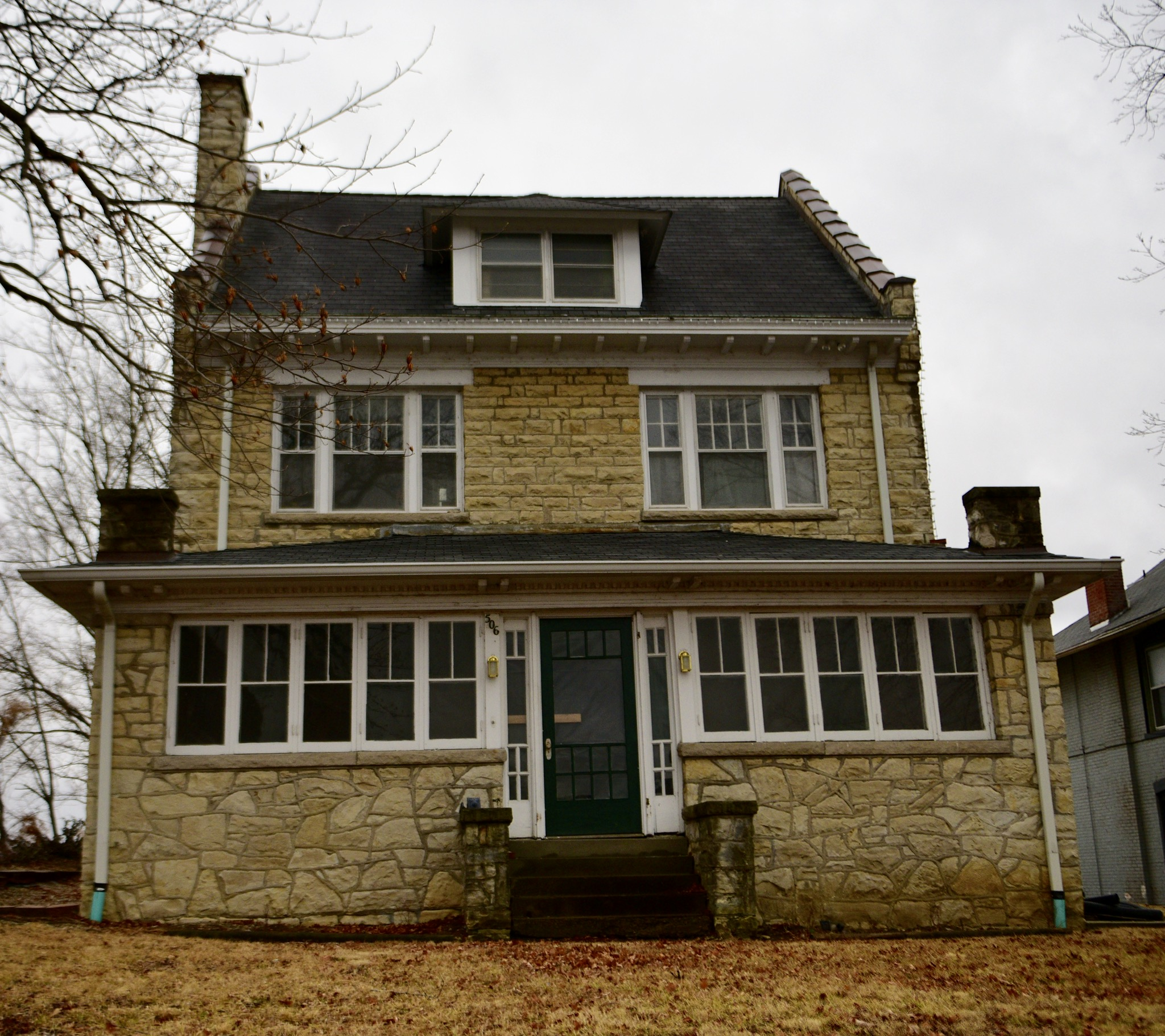
- Cornelius Roach House

- Location within Missouri Location within the United States
- Interactive map showing the location for Hobo Hill Historic District
- Location: 500 blocks of E. Miller & Jackson Sts., Jefferson City, Missouri
- Coordinates: 38°34′16″N 92°10′11″W
- Area: 1.54 acres (0.62 ha)
- Architectural style: Tudor Revival, Colonial Revival, Bungalow/craftsman, American Foursquare
- NRHP reference No.: 12001124
- Added to NRHP: January 2, 2013

Hobo Hill Historic District is a national historic district located in Jefferson City, Cole County, Missouri. It encompasses seven contributing buildings in a predominantly residential section of Jefferson City. The district developed between about 1908 and 1916, and includes representative examples of Tudor Revival, Colonial Revival, Bungalow / American Craftsman, and American Foursquare style architecture. Notable buildings include the Adolph Brandenberger House (1910).

It was listed on the National Register of Historic Places in 2013.
