= H. E. Gensky Grocery Store Building =

- U.S. National Register of Historic Places
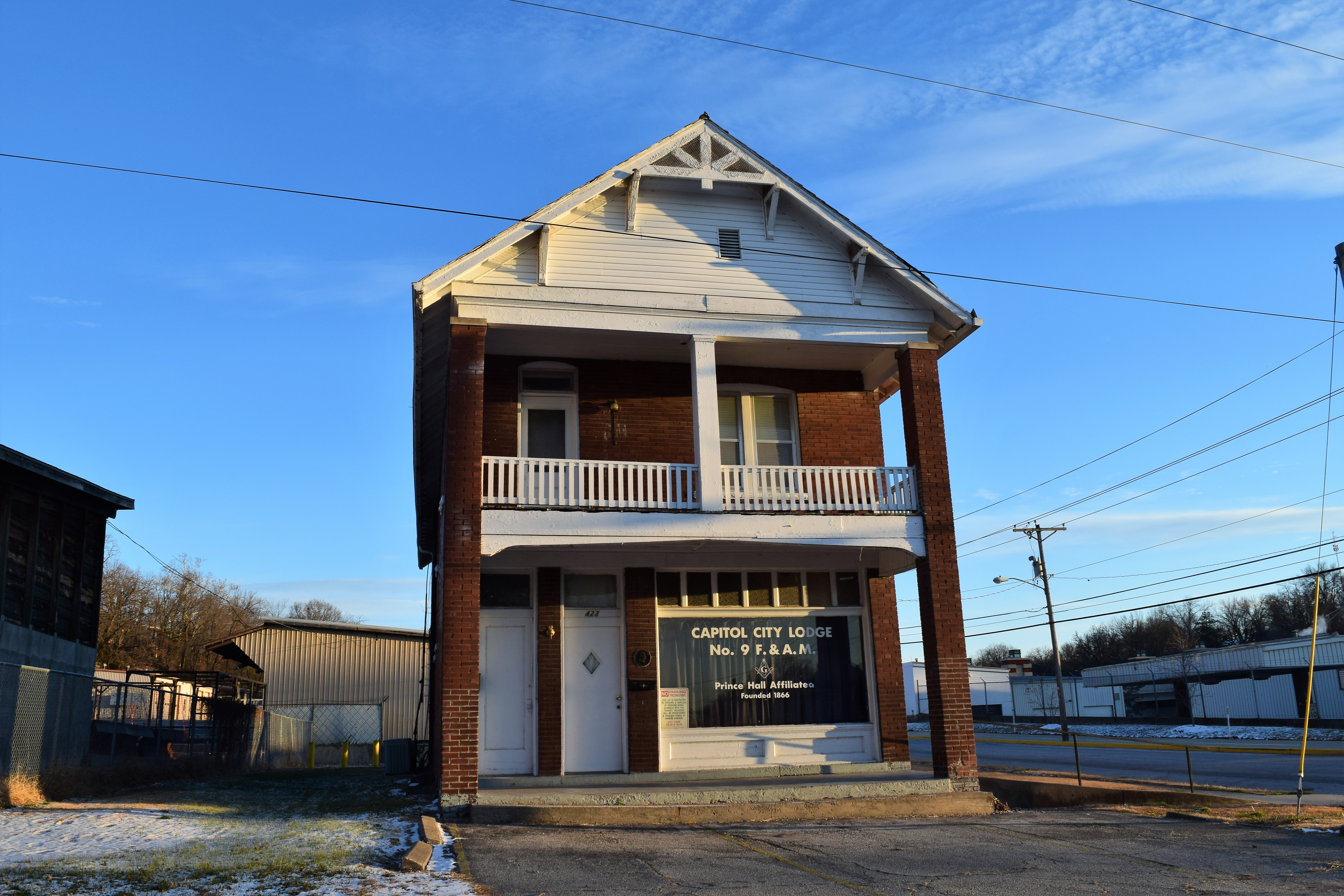

- Location within Missouri Location within the United States
- Location: 423 Cherry St., Jefferson City, Missouri
- Coordinates: 38°34′7″N 92°9′54″W
- Area: less than one acre
- Built: 1915
- Built by: Schmidli, Joseph
- Architectural style: Early Commercial
- NRHP reference No.: 01000628
- Added to NRHP: June 6, 2001

H. E. Gensky Grocery Store Building, also known as Capitol City Lodge No. 9 F. & A.M. and Cherry Street Market, is a historic commercial building located at Jefferson City, Cole County, Missouri. It was built in 1915, and is a two-story, rectangular, brick building. It has a front gable roof and features a two-tiered, recessed front porch supported by continuous, slender brick columns. The building exemplifies Missouri-German craftsmanship.

It was listed on the National Register of Historic Places in 2001.
