= James Wade Bolton House =

Historic house in Louisiana, United States

- U.S. National Register of Historic Places
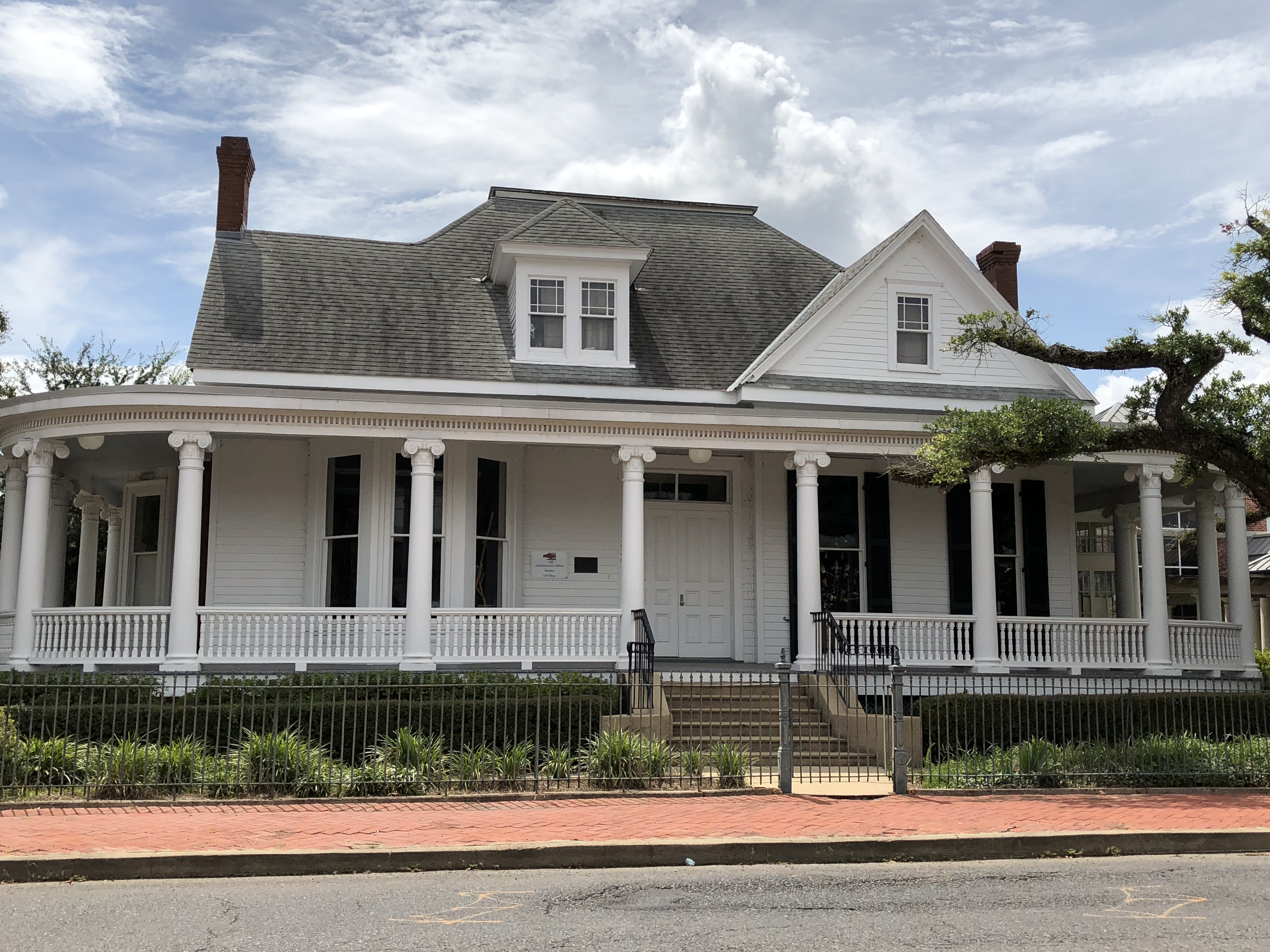

- Location within Louisiana Location within the United States
- Location: 1330 Main Street, Alexandria, Louisiana
- Coordinates: 31°18′35″N 92°26′31″W
- Area: 0.7 acres (0.28 ha)
- Built: 1899
- Architect: Bolton, James W.
- Architectural style: Louisiana Queen Anne
- NRHP reference No.: 79001085
- Added to NRHP: November 15, 1979

James Wade Bolton House is located in Alexandria, Louisiana. It was added to the National Register of Historic Places in 1979; the listing included three contributing buildings.

It is named for the late Alexandria banker James W. Bolton.

The property includes the Bolton House and two dependencies. All are wood frame clapboarded structures built of long leaf yellow pine, and raised above the ground by brick piers. The main house has thirteen large rooms on one floor, and an unfinished attic.
