= Kaullen Mercantile Company =

- U.S. National Register of Historic Places
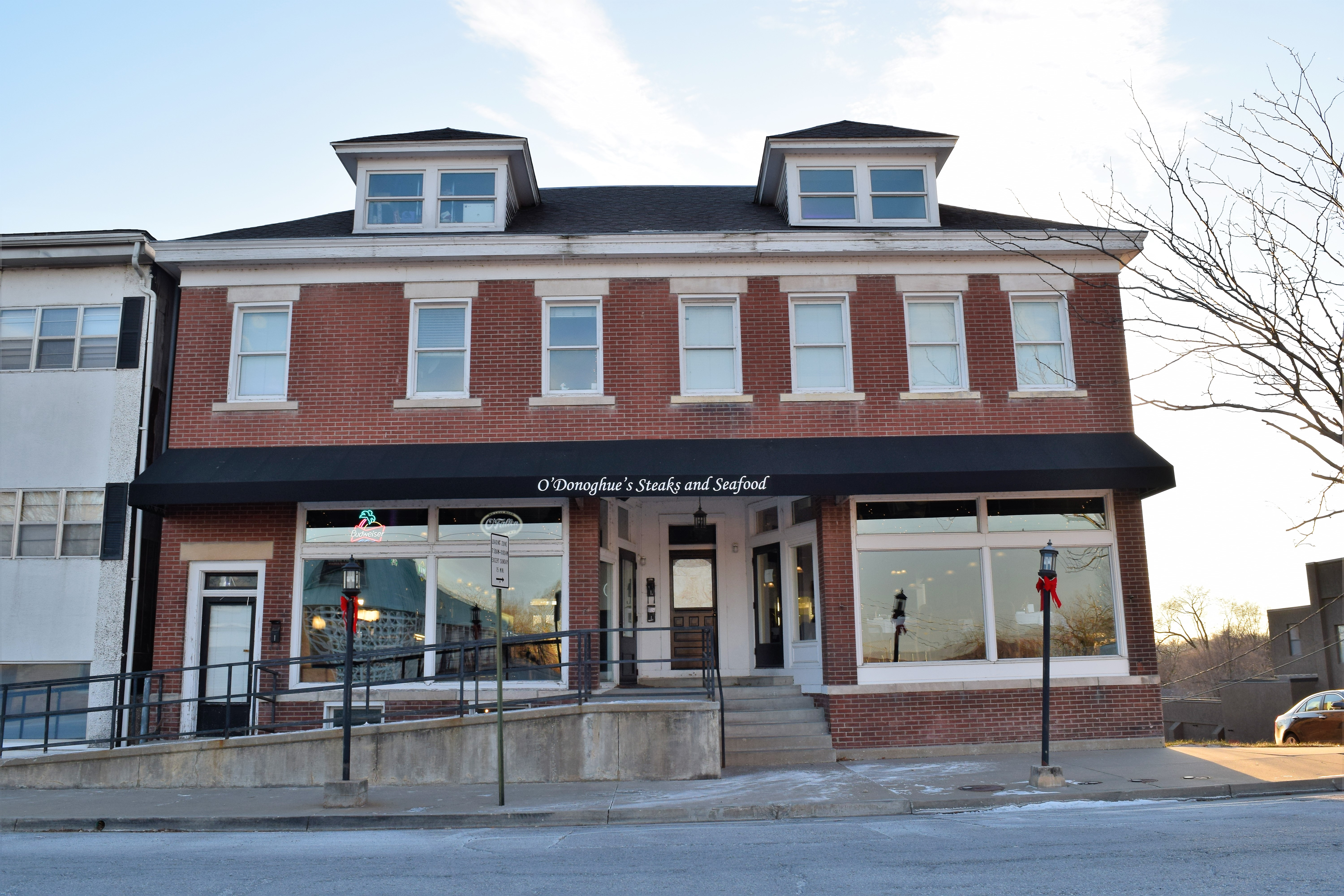

- Location within Missouri Location within the United States
- Location: 900 and 902 E. High St., Jefferson City, Missouri
- Coordinates: 38°34′9″N 92°9′43″W
- Area: less than one acre
- Built: 1896, 1923
- Architectural style: Two-part Commercial Block
- NRHP reference No.: 02001402
- Added to NRHP: November 21, 2002

Kaullen Mercantile Company, also known as Ben Derkum Store Property and Paul Griffin Marine Sales, is a historic commercial building located at Jefferson City, Cole County, Missouri. It was built in 1896, and a major expansion and rehabilitation of the building occurred in 1923. It is a 2 1/2-story, L-shaped, brick two-part commercial block. It has a hipped roof and two hip roof dormers. The building housed a grocery store business from 1896 to 1942, and was in the marine retail service from 1942 to 1977.

It was listed on the National Register of Historic Places in 2002.
