= Oscar G. and Mary H. Burch House =

Historic house in Missouri, United States

- U.S. National Register of Historic Places
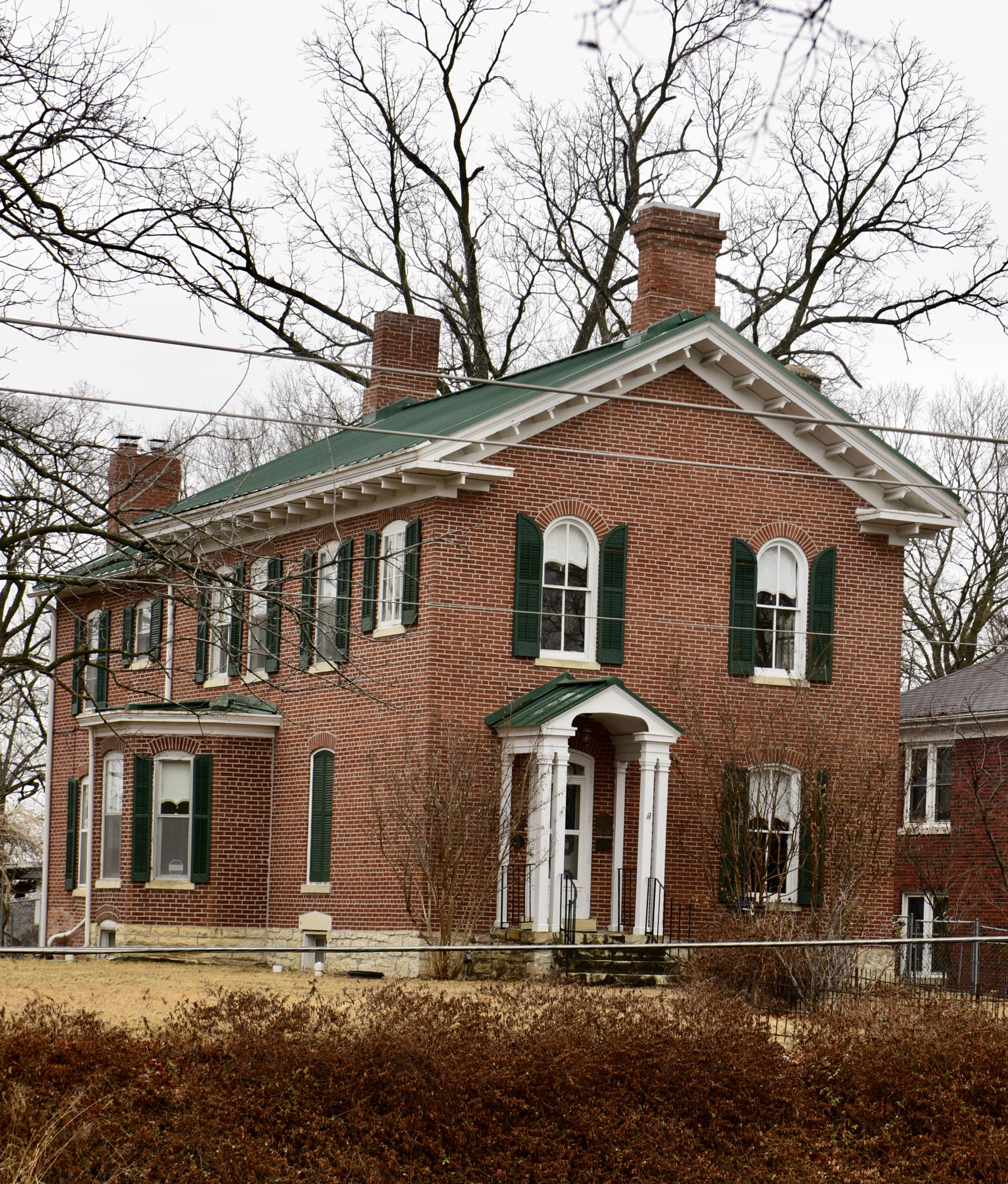

- Location within Missouri Location within the United States
- Location: 924 Jefferson St., Jefferson City, Missouri
- Coordinates: 38°34′14″N 92°10′49″W
- Area: less than one acre
- Built: 1869
- Architectural style: Italianate
- MPS: Southside Munichburg, Missouri MPS
- NRHP reference No.: 02001301
- Added to NRHP: November 15, 2002

Oscar G. and Mary H. Burch House, also known as the Smith House and Sandy House, is a historic home located in Jefferson City, Cole County, Missouri. It was built in 1869, and is a two-story, Italianate style brick dwelling on a stone foundation. It has a front gable roof and segmentally arched windows. Also on the property is a contributing garage.

It was listed on the National Register of Historic Places in 2003.
