= Albert and Wilhelmina Thomas House =

Historic house in Missouri, United States

- U.S. National Register of Historic Places
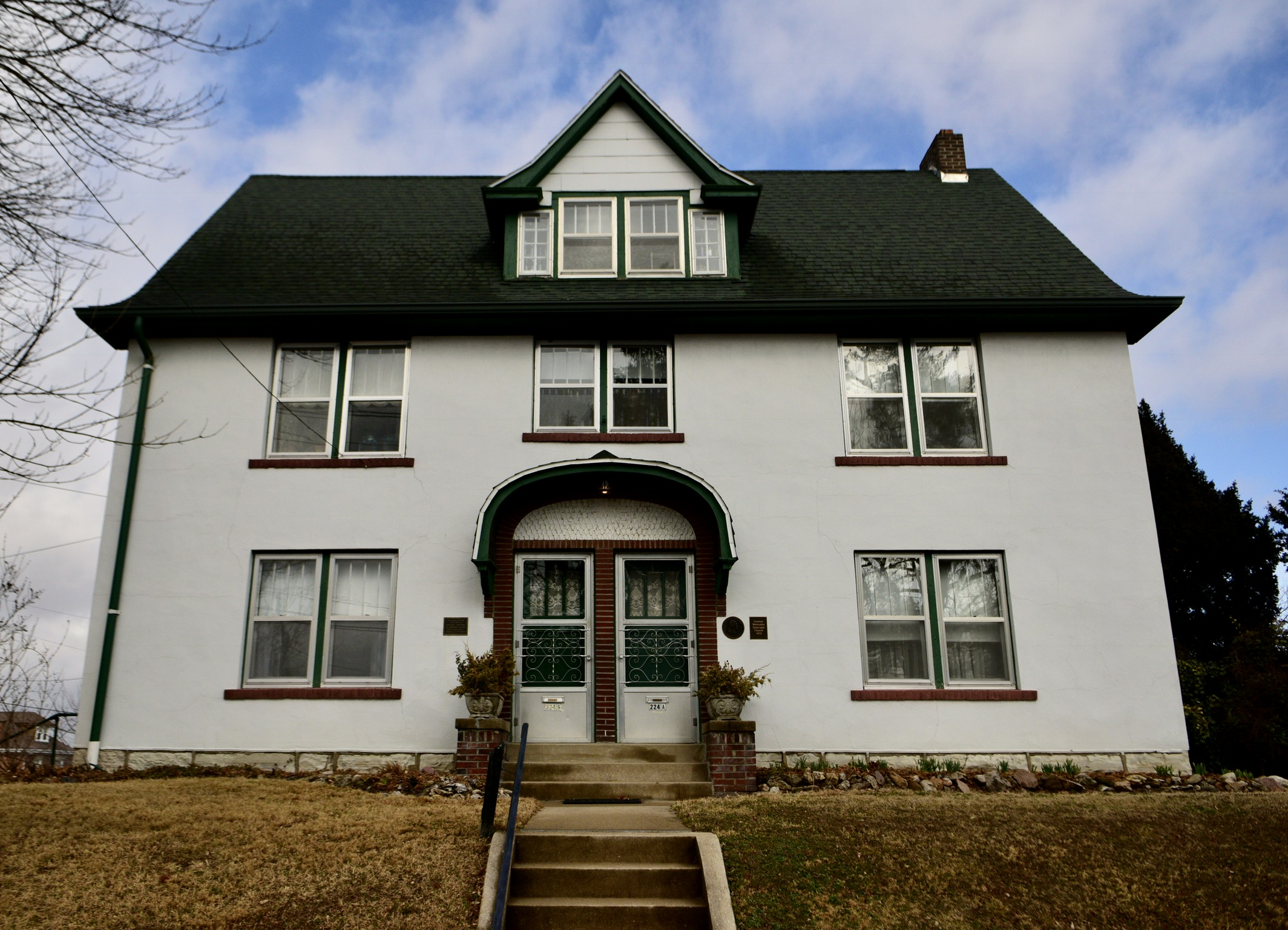

- Location within Missouri Location within the United States
- Location: 224 W. Elm St., Jefferson City, Missouri
- Coordinates: 38°34′33″N 92°10′40″W
- Area: less than one acre
- Built: 1874, 1930
- Built by: Albert Thomas
- Architectural style: Eclectic Revival
- MPS: Southside Munichburg, Missouri MPS
- NRHP reference No.: 02001305
- Added to NRHP: November 14, 2002

Albert and Wilhelmina Thomas House, also known as the Walter A. Schroeder House, is a historic home located in Jefferson City, Cole County, Missouri. It was originally built in 1874 as the German Methodist Episcopal Church. In 1930, the church was altered to a 2 1/2-story, three-bay, two family flat with an eclectic style. It is a stuccoed brick building with a steeply pitched roof.

It was listed on the National Register of Historic Places in 2002.
