= Lewis and Elizabeth Bolton House =

Historic house in Missouri, United States

- U.S. National Register of Historic Places
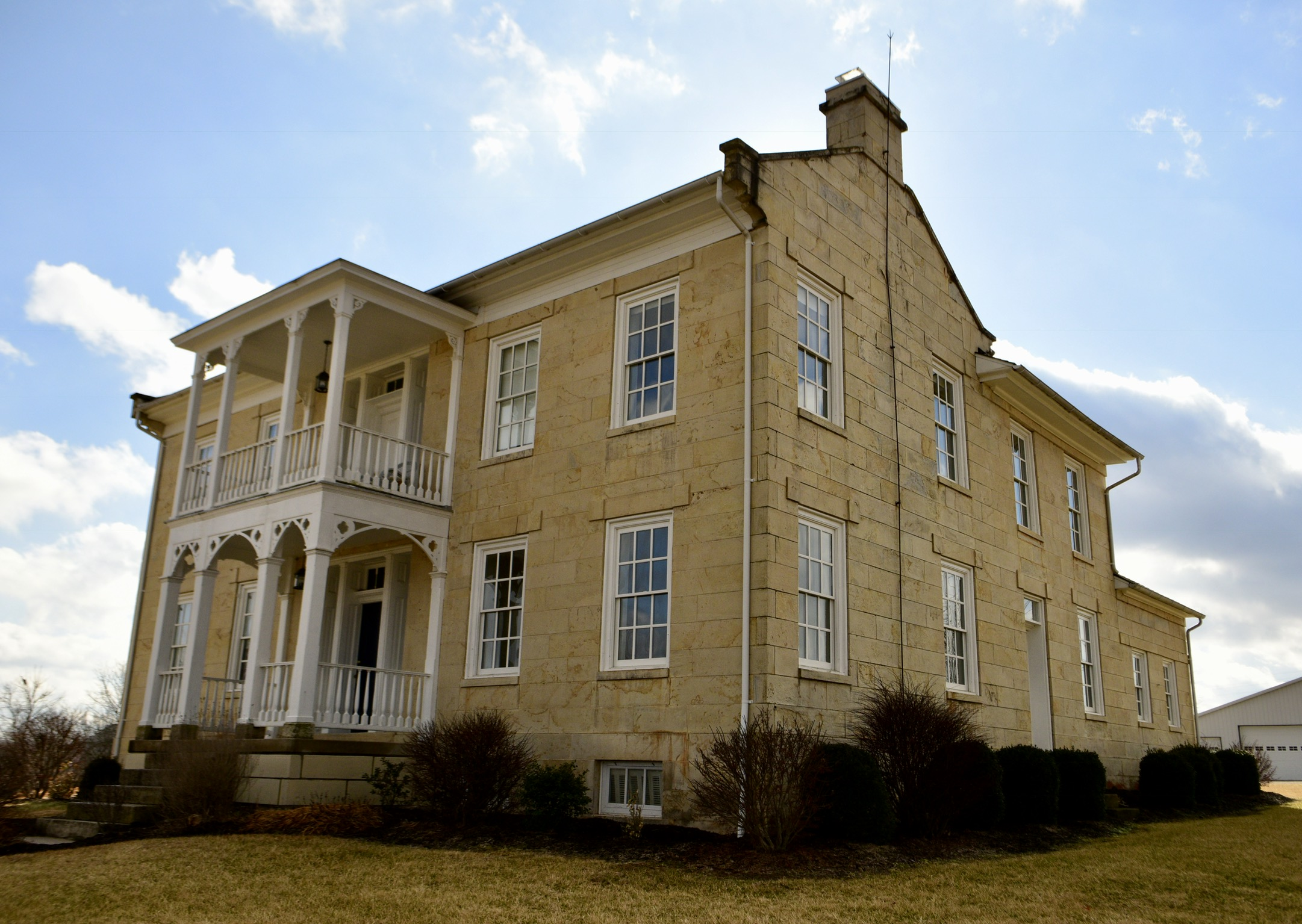

- Location within Missouri Location within the United States
- Location: 9514 Missouri Hwy. W
- Nearest city: Jefferson City, Missouri
- Coordinates: 38°26′43″N 92°9′58″W
- Area: 7.1 acres (2.9 ha)
- Built: c. 1833
- Architectural style: I-house
- NRHP reference No.: 99001017
- Added to NRHP: August 20, 1999

Lewis and Elizabeth Bolton House, also known as the Herman and Johanna Winkelmann House and Belleview Farm, is a historic home located south of Jefferson City, Cole County, Missouri. It was built about 1833, and is a two-story Greek Revival style stone I-house. It has a 1 1/2 to two-story rear ell. It is five bays wide, with a two-story central portico.

It was listed on the National Register of Historic Places in 1999.
