= John M. and Lillian Sommerer House =

Historic house in Missouri, United States

- U.S. National Register of Historic Places
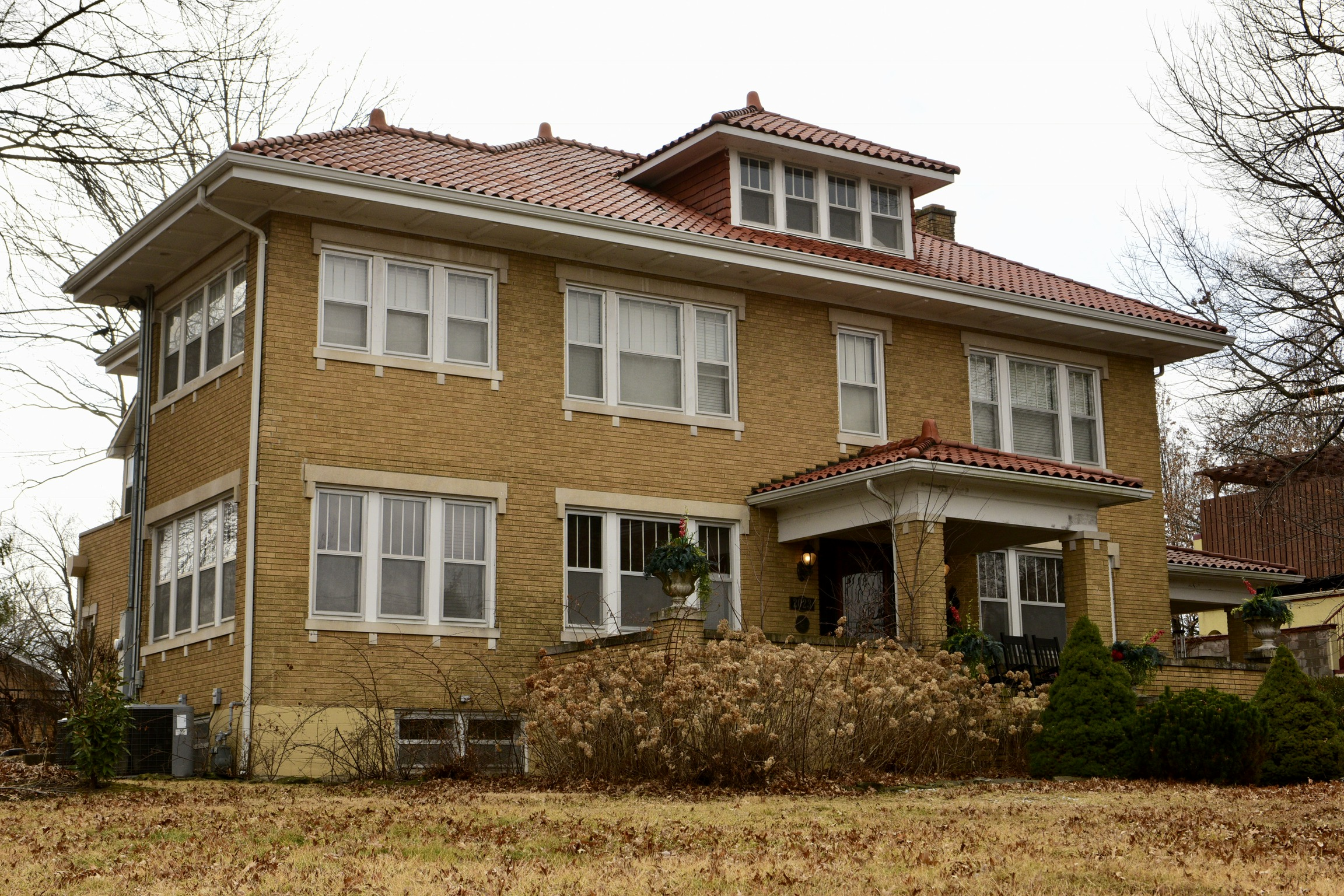

- Location within Missouri Location within the United States
- Location: 2023 W. Main St., Jefferson City, Missouri
- Coordinates: 38°35′27″N 92°12′13″W
- Area: Less than 1 acre (0.40 ha)
- Built: 1929
- Architectural style: Italian Renaissance
- NRHP reference No.: 07000548
- Added to NRHP: June 12, 2007

John M. and Lillian Sommerer House is a historic home located in Jefferson City, Cole County, Missouri. It was built in 1929, and is a 2 1/2-story Italian Renaissance style yellow brick dwelling. It has a low hipped clay tile roof with overhanging eaves. It features a one-story front porch and porte cochere.

It was listed on the National Register of Historic Places in 2007.
