= Lansdown-Higgins House =

Historic house in Missouri, United States

- U.S. National Register of Historic Places
- Location within Missouri Location within the United States
- Location: 5240 Tanner Bridge Rd., near Jefferson City, Missouri
- Coordinates: 38°30′23″N 92°12′19″W
- Area: less than one acre
- Built: c. 1830-1854
- Architectural style: Greek Revival, I-house
- NRHP reference No.: 99001311
- Added to NRHP: November 12, 1999

Lansdown-Higgins House, also known as the Riggins House, Kerl House, and Sommerer House, is a historic home located near Jefferson City, Cole County, Missouri. The original section was built about 1830, and was a 1 1/2-story dogtrot house of hewn log construction. The house achieved its present form about 1854, and is a two-story, three-bay, Greek Revival style frame I-house with a central passage plan. It features an imposing two-story pedimented portico supported by square Doric order columns and massive chimneys of gray limestone.

It was listed on the National Register of Historic Places in 1999.
