= Nelson C. and Gertrude A. Burch House =

Historic house in Missouri, United States

- U.S. National Register of Historic Places
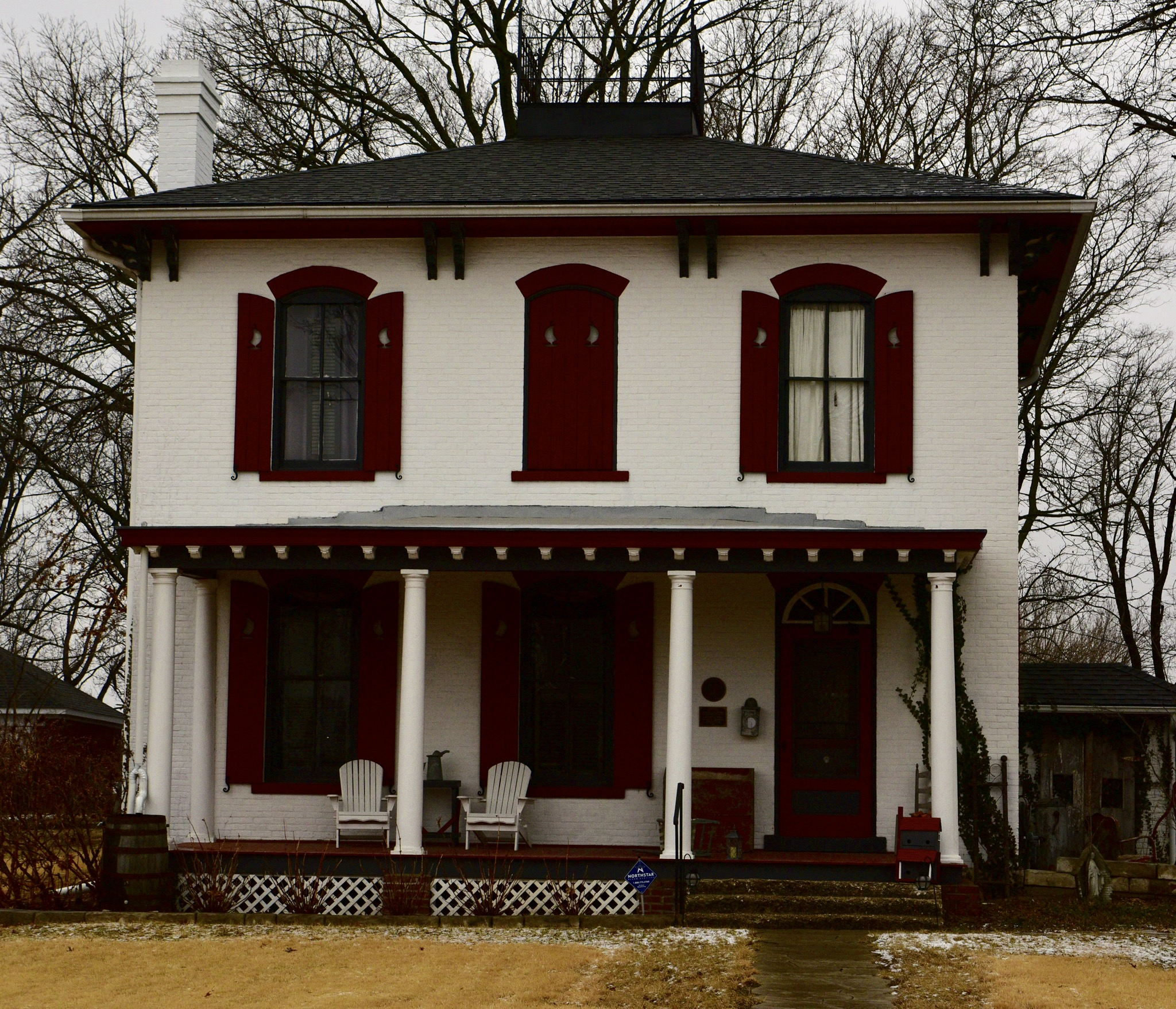

- Location within Missouri Location within the United States
- Location: 115 W. Atchison Street, Jefferson City, Missouri
- Coordinates: 38°34′15″N 92°10′49″W
- Area: less than one acre
- Built: c. 1868
- Architectural style: Italianate
- MPS: Southside Munichburg, Missouri MPS
- NRHP reference No.: 02001302
- Added to NRHP: January 8, 2003

The Nelson C. and Gertrude A. Burch House, (also known as the Smith House and Sandy House) is a historic house located at 115 West Atchison Street in Jefferson City, Cole County, Missouri.

== Description and history ==
Built in 1869, the building is a two-story, Italianate style brick dwelling on a stone foundation. It has a front gable roof and segmentally arched windows. Also on the property is a contributing garage.

It was listed on the National Register of Historic Places on January 8, 2003.
