= Cole House =

Cole House may refer to:

Cole House or Cole Farm or variations may refer to:

in the United States (by state then town or city)

- Hagler-Cole Cabin, Bella Vista, Arkansas, listed on the National Register of Historic Places (NRHP)
- Cole House (Los Angeles), designed by Harry Gesner for Fred Cole
- Cole's Five Cypress Farm, Stockton, California, listed on the NRHP in San Joaquin County, California
- Cole-Hatcher-Hampton Wholesale Grocers, Columbus, Georgia, listed on the NRHP in Muscogee County, Georgia
- Cole House (Paris, Idaho), listed on the NRHP in Bear Lake County, Idaho
- Cole House (Park Ridge, Illinois), a demolished house designed by Bruce Goff
- Joseph J. Cole Jr. House and 1925 Cole Brouette No. 70611, Indianapolis, Indiana, NRHP-listed
- Cole-Evans House, Noblesville, Indiana, listed on the NRHP in Hamilton County, Indiana
- James Omar Cole House, Peru, Indiana, NRHP-listed
- Richard Cole Homestead, Midway, Kentucky, listed on the NRHP in Woodford County, Kentucky
- Cole's Hill, Plymouth, Massachusetts, NRHP-listed
- E. Merritt Cole House, Southbridge, Massachusetts, NRHP-listed
- Benjamin Cole House, Swansea, Massachusetts, NRHP-listed
- Cole House (Winchester, Massachusetts), NRHP-listed
- Frank W. Cole House, Crystal Falls, Michigan, NRHP-listed
- Williams-Cole House, Durand, Michigan, listed on the NRHP in Shiawassee County, Michigan
- Gordon Cole and Kate D. Turner House, Faribault, Minnesota, listed on the NRHP in Rice County, Minnesota
- Arthur W. and Chloe B. Cole House, Houston, Missouri, an octagon house that is NRHP-listed
- Benjamin Young House (Stevensville, Montana), known also as Cole House
- Cole-Allaire House, Leonia, New Jersey, listed on the NRHP in Bergen County, New Jersey
- Thomas Cole House, Catskill, New York, a National Historic Landmark
- Cole Cobblestone Farmhouse, Mendon, New York, NRHP-listed
- Cole-Hasbrouck Farm Historic District, Modena, New York, NRHP-listed
- Black-Cole House, Eastwood, North Carolina, NRHP-listed
- David Cole House, Portland, Oregon, NRHP-listed
- Warren Z. Cole House, Skippack, Pennsylvania, NRHP-listed
- John Cole Farm, Cumberland, Rhode Island, NRHP-listed
- Alex Cole Cabin, Gatlinburg, Tennessee
- Cole House (Nashville, Tennessee), listed on the NRHP in Davidson County, Tennessee
- Cole-Hipp House, Waxahachie, Texas, listed on the NRHP in Ellis County, Texas
- William I. Cole House, Fond du Lac, Wisconsin, listed on the NRHP in Fond du Lac County

== People ==
- Cole House (cyclist), American cyclist

== See also ==
- Cole Block (disambiguation)
- Cole Building (disambiguation)
