= The Boathouse =

A boathouse (or boat house) is a building used for the storage of boats.

The Boathouse may refer to:

- The Boathouse, Guelph, a historic attraction in Guelph, Ontario
- The Boathouse, Twickenham, a commercial property in Twickenham, England
- Hubbard Hall (Annapolis, Maryland), a historic building in Maryland sometimes known as "The Boat House"
- The Hollywood Hills Boathouses, Los Angeles, California
- The Boathouse (album), an album by Gaelic Storm
- The Boathouse, a 2021 Canadian film directed by Hannah Cheesman
- Boathouse (Canadian retail chain), a Canadian retail chain
