= Cole Building =

Cole Building or Cole Block or variations may refer to:

in Scotland

- Jack Cole Building, University of St. Andrews, St. Andrews, named for Jack Cole (scientist)

in the United States

(by state then city)

- Cole Block (San Diego, California), a historic landmark building of San Diego
- Cole Block (Bethel, Maine), building listed on the National Register of Historic Places (NRHP) in Oxford County
- Cole Field House, also known as William P. Cole Student Activities Building, University of Maryland
- Eustace–Cole Hall, Michigan State University, East Lansing, Michigan
- Cole County Historical Society Building, Jefferson City, Missouri, listed on the NRHP in Cole County
- A.L. Cole Memorial Building, Pequot Lakes, Minnesota, listed on the NRHP in Crow Wing County
- Herring-Cole Hall, St. Lawrence University, Canton, New York, NRHP-listed
- Cole Hotel, Fargo, North Dakota, listed on the NRHP in Cass County
- Knerr Block, Floyd Block, McHench Building and Webster and Cole Building, Fargo, North Dakota, listed on the NRHP in Cass County
- Anna Russell Cole Auditorium, Nashville, Tennessee, listed on the NRHP in Davidson County
- Cole Watch Tower, Omro, Wisconsin, listed on the NRHP in Winnebago County

== See also ==
- Cole House (disambiguation)
