= The Adventures of Sinbad =

Television series

- Genre: Action/Adventure; Fantasy
- Created by: Ed Naha
- Based on: Sinbad the Sailor from One Thousand and One Nights
- Developed by: James L. Novack
- Starring: Zen Gesner; George Buza; Tim Progosh; Oris Erhuero; Jacqueline Collen; Mariah Shirley; Julianne Morris
- Theme music composer: Matthew McCauley
- Country of origin: Canada
- No. of seasons: 2
- No. of episodes: 44

Production
- Executive producers: Ed Naha; David Gerber
- Running time: 43-45 minutes
- Production companies: All American Television; Alliance Atlantis; Canwest

Original release
- Network: Global Television Network
- Release: September 28, 1996 – May 24, 1998

The Adventures of Sinbad is a Canadian action-adventure fantasy television series which aired from 1996 to 1998. It follows the story of the pilot of the same name. It revolves around the series' protagonist, Sinbad. The series is a re-telling of the adventures of Sinbad from The Arabian Nights. Created by Ed Naha, it was filmed in southern Ontario, Canada and in Cape Town, South Africa. The tone of the series resembled that of its contemporaries Hercules: The Legendary Journeys, Beastmaster and Xena: Warrior Princess.

== Description ==
A sword and sorcery adventure set in a land of myth and magic in the Middle East, around the Persian Gulf. The series tells of the adventures of Sinbad and his brother as they gather a crew, and set sail in the ship, Nomad, from Baghdad in search of wealth and adventure. Along the way they face witches, wizards, strange tribes and fantastic creatures.

== Premise ==
In the first few episodes: After two years at sea, Sinbad returns to his home, Baghdad. The city is very different from the Baghdad he remembers. It is now in the control of prince Casib and his grand vizier Admir. He lands himself in prison, where he is reacquainted with his older brother, Doubar, and discovers he is to be beheaded. When the princess is kidnapped, the Caliph of Baghdad says Sinbad is the only man he knows who is capable of facing Turok, the man who captured the princess. Before Sinbad is beheaded, Doubar comes to the rescue and sets him free. The brothers meet up with the rest of Sinbad's crew and proceed to Turok's lair, in search for Princess Adena. Sinbad tells his crew they need the help of his and Doubar's old mentor, Master Dim-Dim, so the crew head off for the Isle of Dawn, where he resides. They arrive at the island where they meet Dim-Dim and his new apprentice, Maeve, along with her avian companion, Dermott, a hawk. After the crew leaves the island, Dim-Dim is taken into magical limbo by an enemy. Many episodes in the two seasons mention Dim-Dim, however with the show being cancelled without making the third season, there is never any resolution for finding him. After Dim-Dim goes missing, Maeve decides to join Sinbad and his crew in their search for the lost Master. They find many adventures along the way. Sinbad and his crew's goodness of heart always shines through in each episode.

== Characters ==
=== Nomad crew ===
- Sinbad: Sinbad the Sailor is the series' main protagonist and captain of the ship, "Nomad". In the first episode he returns from a two-year absence, after being swept off his ship and presumed dead. He wears a rainbow bracelet after his return. Portrayed by Zen Gesner.
- Doubar: Doubar is Sinbad's older brother. He is large and exceptionally strong. Portrayed by George Buza.
- Firouz: Firouz is an inventor/scientist. Throughout the series, he invents many modern gadgets, including a bicycle, an umbrella, dynamite sticks and lasers. He frequently doubts in supernatural phenomena showed in the series. Portrayed by Tim Progosh.
- Rongar: Rongar is a mute warrior. He is an expert at knife throwing. Season two features an episode that visits his home and gives the viewer his backstory. Portrayed by Oris Erhuero.
- Maeve: Maeve is a Celtic sorceress, who is skilled in the arts of magic. She has a fiery personality and initially does not get along well with Sinbad, but later they become soulmates. She was only featured in the first season. The first episode for season two has her swept off the Nomad in the midst of a tempest and it is later discovered that the long-lost wizard Dim-Dim took her away to protect her from Rumina, a sorceress, and a long-time foe of both Sinbad and Maeve. Portrayed by Jacqueline Collen. Collen was sacked before the second season, both due to familial reasons and unfit behaviour with the production leading her character to be discarded.
- Dermott: Dermott is a very intelligent hawk that joins the crew with Maeve. It is later discovered that Dermott is Maeve's brother, under a spell cast by Rumina. Portrayed by Dermott the Hawk.
- Bryn: Bryn, a mysterious woman with a talent for magic, was introduced in season two. She meets Sinbad when he is washed ashore on the island she stays on. She had previously been washed ashore on the same island, and retained no memory of who she was or why she was there, apart from that her name was Bryn. She wore a rainbow bracelet matching Sinbad's, and when the two of them eventually managed to find the rest of the crew and escape the island, a message from Dim-Dim indicated she was the key to victory, presumably over the vengeful sorceress, Rumina. In the planned third season, it would have revealed that Bryn is Rumina's younger sister. Portrayed by Mariah Shirley.

=== Allies ===
==== Season 1 allies ====
- Casendra: Appears in "The Village Vanishes". Portrayed by Bianca Amato.

==== Season 2 allies ====
- Shires: Appears in "Ali Rashid and the Thieves". Portrayed by Bianca Amato.

=== Villains ===
- Turok: Turok is an evil sorcerer that is featured in the first two episodes, and the season one finale. He is also the father of Rumina and Bryn. He was to make a full return in the third season. Portrayed by Juan Chioran.
- Rumina: Rumina is the daughter of Turok. She is the main villain of the first season. She loves Sinbad, but simultaneously hates him for murdering her father. Rumina is an expert in the dark arts of magic, which is easy to learn compared to light magic. Rumina is also obsessed with killing Maeve, something she never manages to accomplish. In the planned third season, Rumina would have made her return, it would have also revealed that Rumina is Bryn's older sister. Portrayed by Julianne Morris.
- Scratch: Scratch is a demon from the West. He calls himself the Devil and is a horned and hoofed creature. He goes by many different names, including the "Lord of the Flies". He is introduced in the episode "Conundrum" in season one and appears in two subsequent episodes. Portrayed by Tony Caprari.

==== Season 1 villains ====
- Eblus: Appears in "The Return of Sinbad". A demon who worked with Turok, and the one responsible for Dim Dim's curse. He assumed a human guise and helped Turok bring ruin to whatever city he visited, and the last guise he used was Admir, grand vizier of prince Casib of Baghdad. His ruse was exposed when Rongar searched his belongings (revealed to be human flesh for him to consume), and he attempted to slay the crew, killing Mustapha with his poisonous tail. He was killed by Sinbad when the latter harpooned him in the mouth. Portrayed by Lawrence Bayne.
- Vincenzo: Appears in "Still Life". An insane artist who transformed the rightful rulers of the Island he lived on and their army to marble through the use of magic gloves. He did the same to Dermott and Maeve, but was killed when Sinbad turned the power of the gloves against him, and sent the now petrified Vincenzo falling to his death. Portrayed by Rob Stewart.
- Kris Kattah: Appears in "The Ronin". The wicked ruler of a nation, and Tetsu's former master. Kattah wielded a sword of evil magic that enabled him to transmute into a cloud of poisonous gas. He was killed while in cloud form, when the crew and Tetsu used a giant pinwheel to disperse his body.
- The Gilling: Appears in "The Ties that Bind". A demon who blackmailed a crew of Vikings into kidnapping Maeve as a sacrifice in order to free their ship from his minion, a giant crab.
- Drax: Appears in "The Prince Who Wasn't". The insane uncle of Prince Xander, Drax was cursed to never sleep until the last of his brother's bloodline was erased. He believed this pertained to his nephew and had the boy killed, but Xander's spirit alerted Sinbad's crew to his uncle's actions, and revealed that his mother was pregnant with another child. Drax was then dragged off by the spirits of his victims. Portrayed by Jack Langedijk.
- The Vorgon: Appears in "The Village Vanishes". An immortal monster who possessed people and absorbed the souls of others. The Vorgon planned to possess Sinbad in order to travel the world to find more victims, knowing that Sinbad's reputation would prevent anyone from suspecting him. He lured Sinbad to his latest feeding ground with a fake message from Dim Dim, and began to absorb both the inhabitants and the crew. But he underestimated Sinbad, and was incinerated by the light of the setting sun (he could only come out during the day if he used a host body) after being hurled upward by a catapult.
- Zabtut: Appears in "Masked Mauraders". The corrupt royal protector of Mirhago, Zabtut and his goons robbed the subjects of their money with their unfair taxes. When Sinbad's crew teamed with the youths opposing Zabtut's tyranny, he attempted to flee via a magic carpet, but was followed by Sinbad, and fell to his death during his duel with the sailor.
- Vatek the Ghoul: Appears in "The Ghoul's Tale". An evil sorcerer who cursed Princess Gaia with death on her eighteenth birthday as revenge against her father. Portrayed by Andrew Scorer.
- Bellamur: Appears in "The Rescue". Once a renowned adventurer, Bellamur was in reality a cruel man, tricking the crew into stealing back his unwilling fiancé, Jial, from her real true love, Turhan, a former enemy of Sinbad's. Bellamur's ruse was eventually discovered, and he was stabbed from behind by Jial just when he was about to kill Turhan.
- Mahmud: Appears in "Monument". An alchemist from the island of Mylagia, Mahmud created a formula that turned him into a giant, but also warped his mind, causing him to see himself as a god, and plot to take over the world. His daughter, Jullaner, and the crew tried to convince him of his error, but Mahmud instead tried to kill them. However, while chasing Sinbad and Jullaner, Mahmud's now-superhuman weight caused him to plummet to the center of the world, as the ground beneath him could no longer support his size.
- The Trickster: Appears in "Trickster". A mean-spirited demigod known by many names with a flair for playing cruel tricks on others. He tricked the crew and Rumina into entering a supposedly cursed area where Maeve and Rumina's magic was neutralized, then proceeded to plague the crew and the sorceress. His ruse was discovered when Dermott attacked him, forcing him to show his true form. Portrayed by Ronald France.
- Fontassel: Appears in "The Siren's Song". A greedy and heartless captain who sought to take Poseidon's Trident, only to harpoon a siren in the form of a dolphin. Fontassel and his men became the undead, having died days ago, but kept alive through dark magic. Fontassel attempted to take over the Nomad, but was stopped by Sinbad, and dragged off by Poseidon. Portrayed by Danny Pawlick.

==== Season 2 villains ====
- Xantax: Appears in "The Sacrifice". The ruler of a tribe of island people who attempted to sacrifice Bryn to the island's monster, Caymen. Killed in an explosion. Portrayed by Jonathan Pienaar.
- Komopera: Appears in "The Return of the Ronin". A powerful demon who kidnapped young women in order to force them to breed with his warriors and create a race of deadly warriors. Killed by Sinbad and Tetsu.
- Count Orlock: Appears in "Heart and Soul". A sadistic vampire whose wife, Kalilah, had Sinbad try to retrieve her heart from him in order to finally die after centuries of forced marriage. He attempted to foil his wife's plans by stopping or killing Sinbad and Rongar, but was ultimately defeated when Sinbad exposed him to sunlight, and threw a broken off chair leg at his heart, killing him. Curiously, despite clearly being a vampire (displaying powers of shape-shifting and inhuman strength and durability), Orlock absorbs souls rather than drink blood. Portrayed by Gérard Rudolf.
- Timur the Elder: Appears in "The Voyage to Hell". A legendary villain whose soul resided in Hell. He attempted to use his namesake son as a vessel, manipulating him into villainous acts, but was usually banished back to the underworld by his wife, a witch, who did what she could to save her son from becoming like his monster of a father. When he forcibly took his son into Hell to take over his son's body, Sinbad and the crew followed. In a duel with Sinbad, Timur fell into a chasm. Portrayed by Dick Reineke.
- Ali Rashid: Appear in "Ali Rashid and the Thieves". An evil merchant who stole Rongar's throne, and sent him into exile, Ali Rashid got hold of the Sword of Flame, and attempted to kill the crew. He was defeated by Sinbad and thrown off a balcony by Rongar. Portrayed by Hakeem Kae-Kazim.
- Bakbuk: Appear in "The Gift". A demented hunchback who attempted to join the legendary crew, the Adventurers, but due to an accident, damaged his back, and became an outcast. He spent the next several years plotting his revenge, using magic to bring his dolls to life, and kill the Adventurers one by one. He was seemingly killed when his carriage fell off a cliff, but at the end of the episode, a young girl is seen carrying a doll that bears his image. Portrayed by Danny Pawlick.

=== Recurring characters ===
- Dim-Dim: Master Dim-Dim taught both Sinbad and Maeve and disappeared early on in the series. Sinbad and his crew continue to search for him. Portrayed by Wayne Robson.
- Tetsu: Tetsu is a Ronin Warrior who also wears a rainbow bracelet, like Sinbad and Bryn. He appears once in both seasons. Portrayed by Von Flores.
- Mustapha: Mustapha was in the same prison as Doubar and Sinbad. When they were released to search for the lost princess, Mustapha introduced his good friend Rongar to the team. He dies in Rongar's arms in the second episode after trying to defeat a monster on board of the Nomad. Portrayed by Ian Tracey.

=== Other characters ===
==== Season 1 ====
- Caliph - Gary Reineke
- Prince Casib - Robin Dune
- Princess Adena
- Kalel - Danny Pawlick
- Serendib - Emmanuelle Chriqui
- Azul - Géza Kovács
- Eyolf - Bret Hart
- Malaasco - Dennis O'Connor
- Sali - Kenny Vadas
- Princess Gaia - Tessa Jubber
- Turhan - Mark Dymond
- Talia - Lisa Howard
- Omar - Brian O'Shaughnessy
- Jullaner - Sabrina Grdevich
- Alana - Monika Schnarre

==== Season 2 ====
- Midir - Clive Scott
- Donella - Nicola Hanekom
- Marissa - Paryse Allen
- Kallah - Michele Burgers
- Methana - Terry Norton
- Timur the Younger - Sean Michael Cameron
- Nurudin - Johan Malherbe
- Zorah - Nomvula Meth
- Aidan - Patrick Lyster
- Fallon - Catriona Andrew
- Jared - Graham Clarke
- Ellice - Debbie Rivett
- Kaitlin - Julie Hartley
- Village girl ("The Gift") - Melissa Haiden
- Aziz - Lloyd Kandlin
- Knarlic - Rick Rogers
- Medusa - Tandhi Buchan
- Euryale - Bonita Wolmarans
- Stheno - Ursula Venter
- Yaga - Lourens Cilliers
- Mal - Keith Grenville
- Kullu - Nick Boraine
- Albetta - Andre Jacobs
- Uruk - Gary Robbins
- Kumar - James Ryan
- Hooshang - Greg Latter
- Kundalini - Gordon van Rooyen
- Masari - Caz Abrahams
- Ria - Michelle Van Schalkwyk
- Mara - Ursula Venter
- Ruane - Graham Weir
- Jefscut - Lindsay Reardon
- Woman ("The Invaders") - Cynthia Farrelly Gesner
- Baby ("The Invaders") - Finn Harry Gesner
- Adobi - David Sherwood
- Gianna - Janet Stignant
- Agramant - Iain Winter-Smith
- M'Ling - Michelle Meyer
- Carga - Kevin Jubinville
- Velda - Hanli Rolfes
- Borell - Mike Huff
- Informer ("A City Under Plague") - Matthew Dylan Roberts
- Empress Hitria - Lisa Stohard
- Kasha - Brian O'Shaughnessy
- Caricol - Gérard Rudolf
- Radue - Garwin Sanford
- Von - Douglas O'Keeffe
- Prince Armound - Kevin Otto
- Fin - Maurice Podbrey
- Matsue - Frank Opperman
- Tang - Anthony Bishop
- Malek - Anthony De Longis
- Deanna - Candice Hillebrand
- Torrid - Peter Krummek
- Mutaro - Jamie McKnight
- Nesher - Gavin van den Berg
- Veedon - Richard Comar
- Dara - Gabriella Cirillo
- Sultan - John Carson
- Tarsus - Jonathan Pienaar
- Garrick - Markus Parilo
- Ula - Robin Michele Stewart
- Atari - David Thomas
- Amphitrite - Michelle Douglas
- Shwind - Adam Pike
- Iyt - Toni Mitchell
- Woman ("The Minotaur") - Jan Neethling
- Taryn - Katie Griffin
- Naaupo - Danny Keogh
- Taryn's Father - Sean Taylor
- Korla - Raoul Max Trujillo
- Para - Kelly Fiddick
- Ajeeb - John Stead
- Mother ("The Guardians") - Angela Martin
- Town Leader - John Springett
- Baby Ajeeb - Abi Colins/Megan Colins
- Mala - Laura Steed

== Episodes ==
=== Season 1 (1996–97) ===
In season one, Sinbad and his crew search for Master Dim-Dim, Sinbad and Maeve's old teacher who has disappeared.

No. overall	No. in season	Title	Directed by	Written by	Original release date
1	1	"Return of Sinbad: Part 1"	Clay Boris	Ed Naha	September 28, 1996
Returning home after two years at sea, Sinbad finds himself in prison. But the prince who threw him in there releases him for aid when his bride is kidnapped.
2	2	"Return of Sinbad: Part 2"	Clay Boris	Ed Naha	October 5, 1996
3	3	"The Beast Within"	Neill Feamley	Ed Naha	October 12, 1996
Sinbad is forced to play a game of hunter and prey with one of Rumina's monsters.
4	4	"Still Life"	Clay Borris	John Lafia	October 19, 1996
Sinbad and the crew land on an island owned by an artist with a disturbing secret surrounding his statues.
5	5	"The Ronin"	Clay Borris	Ed Naha	October 26, 1996
Receiving a call from an old friend, Sinbad must defeat a master samurai in order to keep Baronia safe from a king with a sword of evil magic.
6	6	"Little Miss Magic"	Neill Fearnley	Michael Cassutt	November 2, 1996
The crew becomes trapped in a cursed town and try to keep a young magic user away from Rumina.
7	7	"King Firouz"	Neill Fearnley	John Shirley	November 9, 1996
Firouz is deceived into helping a corrupt general and princess.
8	8	"The Ties That Bind"	Clay Borris	Craig Volk	November 16, 1996
Maeve is captured by Vikings who plan to sacrifice her to a monster.
9	9	"Double Trouble"	Ken Girotti	Jule Selbo	November 23, 1996
Using her magic, Rumina shrinks Sinbad and uses his form to smear his image.
10	10	"Conundrum"	George Mendeluk	Ed Naha	November 30, 1996
While rescuing Rongar, Sinbad, Doubar and Firouz find themselves helping a young woman retrieve four elemental skulls. But the quartet doesn't suspect the truth behind the supposed captive of the demon, Scratch.
11	11	"The Prince Who Wasn't"	Alan Simmonds	Ardwight Chamberlain	December 21, 1996
The ghost of a murdered prince convinces the crew to help him overthrow his insane uncle.
12	12	"The Village Vanishes"	George Mendeluk	James L. Novack	December 28, 1996
Upon receiving a message supposedly from Dim Dim, Sinbad and the crew find themselves trapped in a village where no one can leave.
13	13	"Masked Marauders"	Alan Simmonds	Robert Engels	February 1, 1997
The crew finds themselves helping a group of kids fight the corrupt lawmaker of an island while on the search for Dim Dim.
14	14	"The Ghoul's Tale"	Jimmy Kaufman	Craig Volk	February 8, 1997
The crew must lift a curse placed on a princess by the evil Vathak the Ghoul.
15	15	"The Rescue"	Jimmy Kaufman	Robert Engels	February 15, 1997
The legendary adventurer Belamor asks the crew to rescue his wife from an old enemy of Sinbad's, Turhan. But it soon becomes apparent who the real villain is.
16	16	"The Eye of Kratos"	James Head	Ardwight Chamberlain	February 22, 1997
An old friend leads the crew to a mission involving an evil cult.
17	17	"The Bully"	Terry Ingram	Ed Naha	March 1, 1997
Sinbad learns that the bully responsible for the death of his first love is on the island the ship's landed on. But he must put his mission of vengeance aside to save a village from a cyclops.
18	18	"Monument"	James Head	Sandy Gunter	April 26, 1997
A young woman gets the crew to help her find her father, not knowing what dear ol' dad's been up to.
19	19	"Trickster"	George Mendeluk	Ed Naha	May 3, 1997
The crew and Rumina must work together when they enter a supposedly haunted area where Maeve and Rumina's magic doesn't work.
20	20	"The Siren's Song"	George Mendeluk	Craig Volk	May 10, 1997
After they rescue a group of men from the sea, the crew begins to notice strange happenings aboard the ship. What dark secret do these men hold?
21	21	"Isle of Bliss"	Terry Ingram	Victoria Wozniak & David Morris	May 17, 1997
The crew is hired to retrieve a magic sword with the help of a female captain. But the captain has her own plans for it, and isn't exactly what she seems.
22	22	"The Vengeance of Rumina"	Neil Williamson	Ed Naha	May 24, 1997
On the one year anniversary of when Sinbad decapitated her father, Rumina makes a pact with Scratch to finish off their mutual enemy and restore Turok to his full form.

=== Season 2 (1997–98) ===
In the opening of season two, Maeve is swept away during a storm. In his attempt to rescue her, Sinbad washes up on an island where he meets Bryn, who joins his crew. This season is darker in tone than season one, and explores the mystery of the rainbow bracelets.

No. overall	No. in season	Title	Directed by	Written by	Original release date
23	1	"The Sacrifice"	Alan Simmonds	Ed Naha	October 4, 1997
Washing ashore after a storm, Sinbad finds himself on an island where he rescues a young woman named Bryn from becoming a sacrifice.
24	2	"The Return of the Ronin"	James Head	Ed Naha	October 11, 1997
Sinbad and the crew reunite with Tetsu when the wandering samurai comes to the aid of a village under attack by seven demons.
25	3	"Heart and Soul"	Alan Simmonds	Ed Naha	October 18, 1997
Sinbad and Rongar must defeat a vampire in order to save the rest of the crew from the blood (or rather soul) sucking fiend's wife.
26	4	"The Voyage to Hell"	James Head	Craig Volk	October 25, 1997
The spirit of a legendary villain plans to use his son as a vessel for his soul, and the crew must journey into Hell to rescue the young man.
27	5	"Ali Rashid and the Thieves"	H.P. Hobbes	Craig Volk	November 1, 1997
The truth about Rongar's past is revealed when the Nomad reaches his homeland, and the crew must foil the plans of the corrupt Prince Ali Rashid.
28	6	"The Gift"	Alan Simmonds	Ed Naha	November 8, 1997
A reunion with Sinbad and Doubar's old crew turns into a nightmare when a deranged hunchback named Bakbuk uses enchanted dolls to murder them one by one.
29	7	"The Curse of the Gorgons"	H.P. Hobbes	Sonny Gordon	November 15, 1997
A boy recruits the crew to save his village from the thrall of a gorgon. But they soon learn that she wasn't the only one there.
30	8	"The Beast of Basra"	Terry Ingram	Ed Naha	November 22, 1997
Doubar is transformed into a werewolf.
31	9	"The Monster"	Terry Ingram	Steven Baum	November 29, 1997
A gentle giant named Uruk is forced to do evil by a sorcerer via a magic necklace, and the crew must release the poor man from the magic user's grasp.
32	10	"The Passengers"	Brenton Spencer	Craig Volk	December 20, 1997
Two guests aboard the Nomad brainwash Sinbad for a dark purpose.
33	11	"The Invaders"	George Mendeluk	Paul Tracey	December 27, 1997
Sinbad has a close encounter when an alien spaceship lands on an island. But that's the least of his worries, as a religious fanatic rallies the townspeople to try and destroy the "demons". The ending implies that Sinbad and Bryn's bracelets are actually alien technology.
34	12	"The Book of Before"	Alan Simmonds	Adam Armus & Nora Kay Foster	January 3, 1998
An evil sorcerer plans to free the captured evil souls within an ancient book.
35	13	"A City Under Plague"	Terry Ingram	Kathryn Baker	January 24, 1998
Sinbad and Firouz help an old friend of Firouz's try to cure a plague that's stricken the woman's village. But there's more to the disease than appears.
36	14	"The Empress"	George Mendeluk	Craig Volk	February 7, 1998
Sinbad becomes to target of affection for an immortal empress.
37	15	"Castle Keep"	Brenton Spencer	Ed Naha	February 14, 1998
Arrested under the false charge of piracy, Sinbad joins with his fellow prisoners to try and overthrow the corrupt prince. But Sinbad learns that the leader of the rebellion may be much worse than the prince.
38	16	"The Gryphon's Tale"	Brenton Spencer	Ed Naha	February 21, 1998
An evil hunter steals a gryphon's egg, inciting the beast's wrath.
39	17	"The Beast of the Dark"	Neil Williamson	James L. Novack	February 28, 1998
The crew finds themselves trapped on an island with a young man who has a connection with an invisible monster.
40	18	"Survival Run"	George Mendeluk	Ed Naha	March 7, 1998
The crew must dodge one assassination attempt after another when they escort a murder suspect to trial.
41	19	"The Minotaur"	Steve Stern	Sandy Gunter	May 2, 1998
Sinbad comes to the aid of freedom fighters opposing the tyrannical ruler of an island by finding the Axe of Poseidon. But to stop the tyrant, he must defeat a minotaur.
42	20	"Stalkers"	George Mendeluk	Mahatma Kane Jeeves	May 9, 1998
In the vein of "Them!", an island is terrorized by giant ants created and controlled by a deranged scientist.
43	21	"The Guardians"	Steve Stern	Craig Volk	May 16, 1998
The crew must keep an infant safe from bandits who want to prevent him from achieving his destiny.
44	22	"Hell House"	Terry Ingram	Ed Naha	May 23, 1998
Scratch returns to try and force Sinbad to work for evil. But a mysterious woman sees to it that the demented demon's efforts are in vain.

=== Planned third season ===
Due to the success of the show, a third and final season was planned, but a contract dispute led to the series' cancellation. According to Ed Naha, had the third season been made, Rumina would return after a year of absence with a renewed desire to kill Sinbad. Bryn would have been infected with an incubus, and the crew takes her to a healer, believing him to be Dim Dim, only to find out it's actually a now deformed Turok, who would remain a neutral character throughout the season and possibly be the one who would destroy Rumina, thus; freeing Dermott from her spell. It would also reveal that Bryn is Turok's daughter and Rumina's younger sister. The series finale would have also put a close to the mystery of the Rainbow Bracelets.

== Home media ==
Entertainment One released season 1 on DVD on May 25, 2004.

Alliance Home Entertainment has released both seasons on DVD in Canada.

DVD name	Episodes	Release dates
Season 1	22	October 19, 2010
Season 2	22	January 4, 2011
