= Mo Ostin =

American record executive (1927–2022)

- Born: Morris Meyer Ostrofsky; March 27, 1927; New York City, New York, United States
- Died: July 31, 2022 (aged 95); Los Angeles, California, United States
- Education: UCLA
- Occupation: Record producer
- Spouse: Evelyn Ostin (died 2005)
- Children: Michael; Kenny; Randy

Mo Ostin (born Morris Meyer Ostrofsky; March 27, 1927 – July 31, 2022) was an American record executive. The chairman and CEO of Warner Bros. Records from 1972 to 1994 and co-founder of DreamWorks Records, he was inducted into the Rock and Roll Hall of Fame in 2003.

== Early life ==
Ostin was born Morris Meyer Ostrofsky in New York City on March 27, 1927. His family was Jewish and fled Russia during the Russian Revolution. They eventually relocated to Los Angeles when Ostin was thirteen and operated a small grocery market close to the Fairfax Theatre. He attended Fairfax High School, before studying economics at the University of California, Los Angeles (UCLA). He subsequently commenced studies at the UCLA School of Law, but ultimately dropped out to support his family.

== Career ==
Ostin began his career in the mid-1950s as comptroller at Clef Records, a record company started by Norman Granz, brother of friend and neighbor, Irving Granz. The company was soon renamed 'Verve', where he was involved with Jazz At The Philharmonic, a worldwide concert promotion operation that provided a live performance platform for the label's touring stars. Frank Sinatra tried and failed to buy Verve, which was eventually sold to MGM Records. Sinatra was reportedly so impressed by the company's artists and the management's style that he formed his own Reprise Records in 1960 and hired Ostin to head it. Three years later, Reprise joined forces with Warner Bros. The first rock act Ostin signed to Reprise was the Kinks. He signed Jimi Hendrix in the spring of 1967 based on hearing "Hey Joe", then was amazed after seeing him perform at the Monterey Pop Festival.

Ostin ultimately spent 31 years at Warner/Reprise from 1963 to 1994, serving as its chairman and CEO from 1972 onwards. He oversaw the signing of Prince, Neil Young, Joni Mitchell, Fleetwood Mac, R.E.M., Madonna, Paul Simon, Talking Heads, the Grateful Dead, the Red Hot Chili Peppers, Van Halen, the Who, and Randy Newman. He was noted for giving artists creative freedom and creating a company geared towards artists, attributing this outlook to his time with Sinatra. Ostin later recounted how he trusted Prince to the point where he would only listen to his music once it was completed. Ostin was also instrumental in the acquisition of the independent Elektra label by Warner Communications, as well as the subsequent formation of WEA Corporation and WEA International. Recognized as an industry titan, he served as chairman of the Recording Industry Association of America for a two-year term. He left Warner acrimoniously in 1994 after they requested that he slash his payroll, turning down their offer of a three-year extension. He described the situation as "the toughest thing I've ever been through in the business", adding that "it shook [him] to the core".

After departing Warner Bros., Ostin went on to join the music division of the entertainment conglomerate DreamWorks SKG in October 1995. In 2003, Ostin was inducted into the Rock and Roll Hall of Fame by Paul Simon, Neil Young, and Lorne Michaels. Three years later, he received The Recording Academy President's Merit Award at the 2006 Grammy Salute to Industry Icons.

George Harrison wrote the song "Mo" as a tribute to Ostin.

=== Philanthropy ===
A graduate of UCLA, Ostin and his wife Evelyn donated $10 million and played a critical role in establishing the university's Evelyn and Mo Ostin Music Center, a state-of-the-art campus music facility. In March 2015, Ostin donated $10 million to UCLA for the Mo Ostin Basketball Center, a state-of-the-art training facility, which was opened in October 2017 and named in his honor. He also sat on the board of visitors for the UCLA School of the Arts and Architecture and the UCLA Herb Alpert School of Music, and supported the UCLA Center for the Art of Performance.

== Personal life ==
Ostin was married to Evelyn for 55 years until her death in 2005. Together, they had three children, Randy, Kenny, and Michael Ostin. All three worked as Warner executives. Both Kenny and Randy predeceased him in 2004 and 2013, respectively.

Ostin died in his sleep on July 31, 2022, at the age of 95. From 1987 until his death, Ostin was the owner of the modernist Wave House in Malibu, California.
