= Cole County Courthouse and Jail-Sheriff's House =

- U.S. National Register of Historic Places
- U.S. Historic district – Contributing property
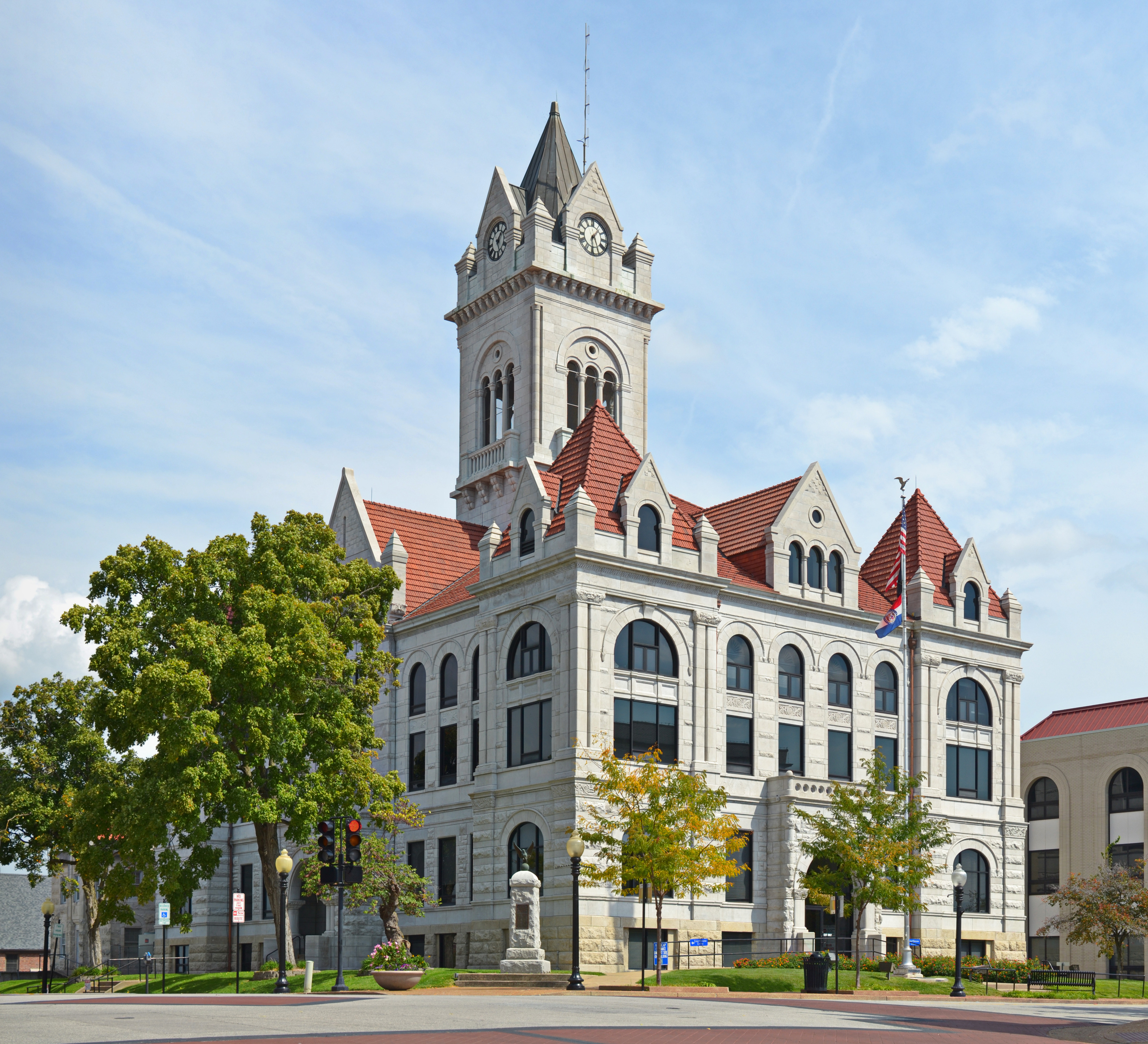
- Cole County Courthouse, September 2014

- Location within Missouri Location within the United States
- Interactive map showing the location for Cole County Courthouse
- Location: Monroe and E. High Sts., Jefferson City, Missouri
- Coordinates: 38°34′30″N 92°10′9″W
- Area: 9.9 acres (4.0 ha)
- Built: 1896-1897
- Architect: Miller, Frank B.
- Architectural style: Romanesque
- NRHP reference No.: 73001038
- Added to NRHP: April 3, 1973

Cole County Courthouse and Jail-Sheriff's House is a historic courthouse, jail and sheriff's residence, located in Jefferson City, Cole County, Missouri. It was built in 1896-1897 and is a three-story, Romanesque Revival style, stone building. It measures 107 feet by 69 feet and features corner pavilions and a central clock tower.

It was listed on the National Register of Historic Places in 1973. It is located in the Missouri State Capitol Historic District.
