= Missouri State Capitol Historic District =

Historic district in Missouri, United States

- U.S. National Register of Historic Places
- U.S. Historic district
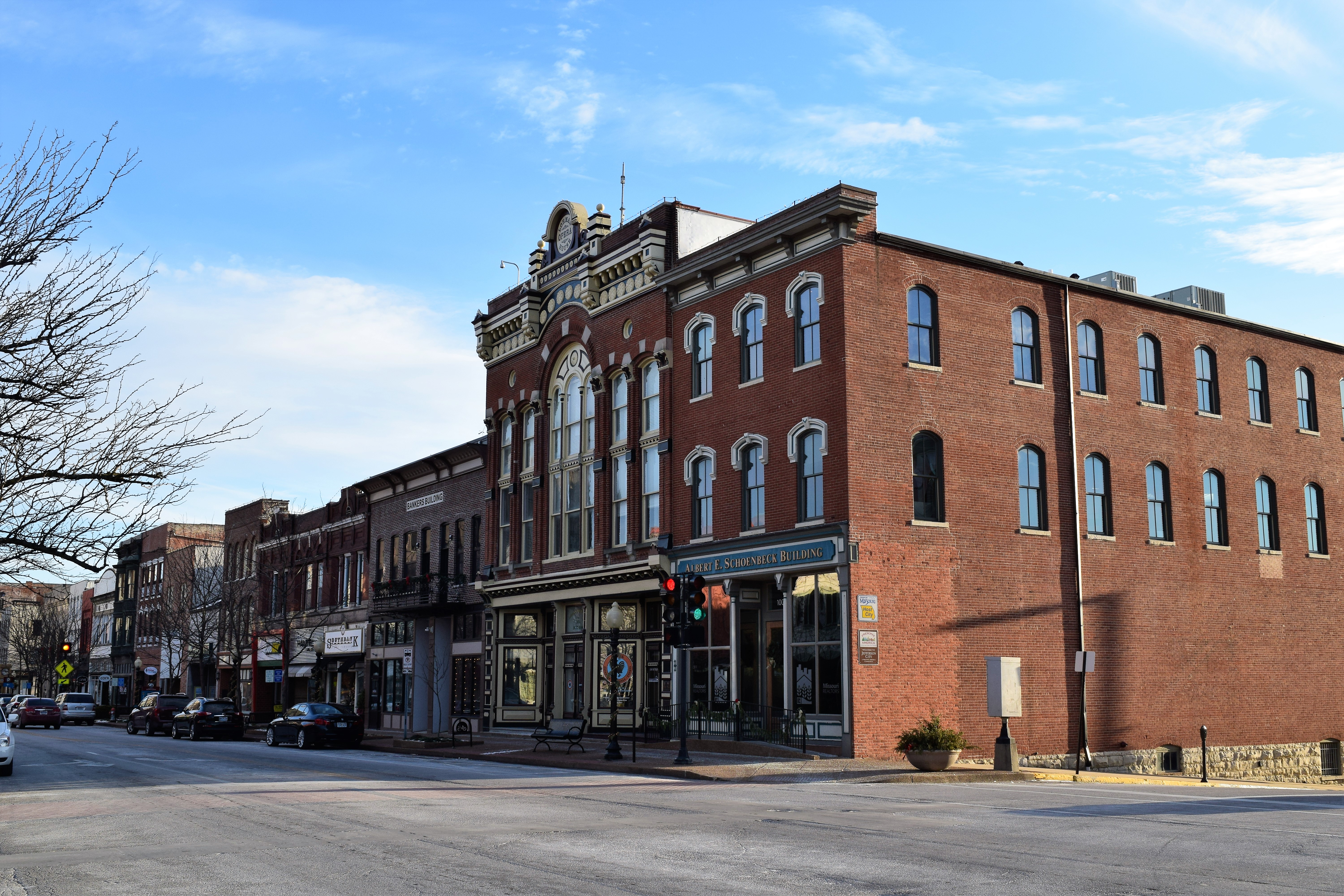
- South side of the 100 block of East High Street

- Location within Missouri Location within the United States
- Location: Bounded roughly by Adams, McCarthy, Mulberry Sts. and the Missouri River; also the 200 block of W. McCarty St. and 406-408 Washington St., Jefferson City, Missouri
- Coordinates: 38°34′39″N 92°10′16″W
- Area: 115 acres (47 ha)
- Built by: Kolkmeyer, Henry W. & Sons
- Architect: Multiple; Besecke & Swanson
- Architectural style: Late 19th And 20th Century Revivals, Late Victorian, Queen Anne, Mission/spanish Revival
- NRHP reference No.: 76001109, 02000804 (Boundary Increase)
- Added to NRHP: June 18, 1976, July 17, 2002 (Boundary Increase)

Missouri State Capitol Historic District is a national historic district located at Jefferson City, Cole County, Missouri. It encompasses 122 contributing buildings in the central business district of Jefferson City. The district developed between about 1850 and 1950, and includes representative examples of Classical Revival, Late Victorian, Queen Anne, Mission Revival, and Modern Movement style architecture. Located in the district are the separately listed Missouri State Capitol, Lohman's Landing Building, Cole County Historical Society Building, Cole County Courthouse and Jail-Sheriff's House, Missouri Governor's Mansion, and Tergin Apartment Building.

Other notable buildings include the St. Peter's Catholic Church complex (1881–1883), Margaret Upshulte House (c. 1865), Broadway State Office Building (1938), Supreme Court of Missouri Building (1905–1906), U.S. Post Office and Courthouse (1932–1934), Lohman's Opera House (c. 1885), Missouri State Optical (c. 1840s), First United Methodist Church (1900), Carnegie Public Library (1901), Temple Beth El (1883), and Joseph and Susie Kolkmeyer House (c. 1907).

It was listed on the National Register of Historic Places in 1976, with a boundary increase in 2002.

== Gallery ==
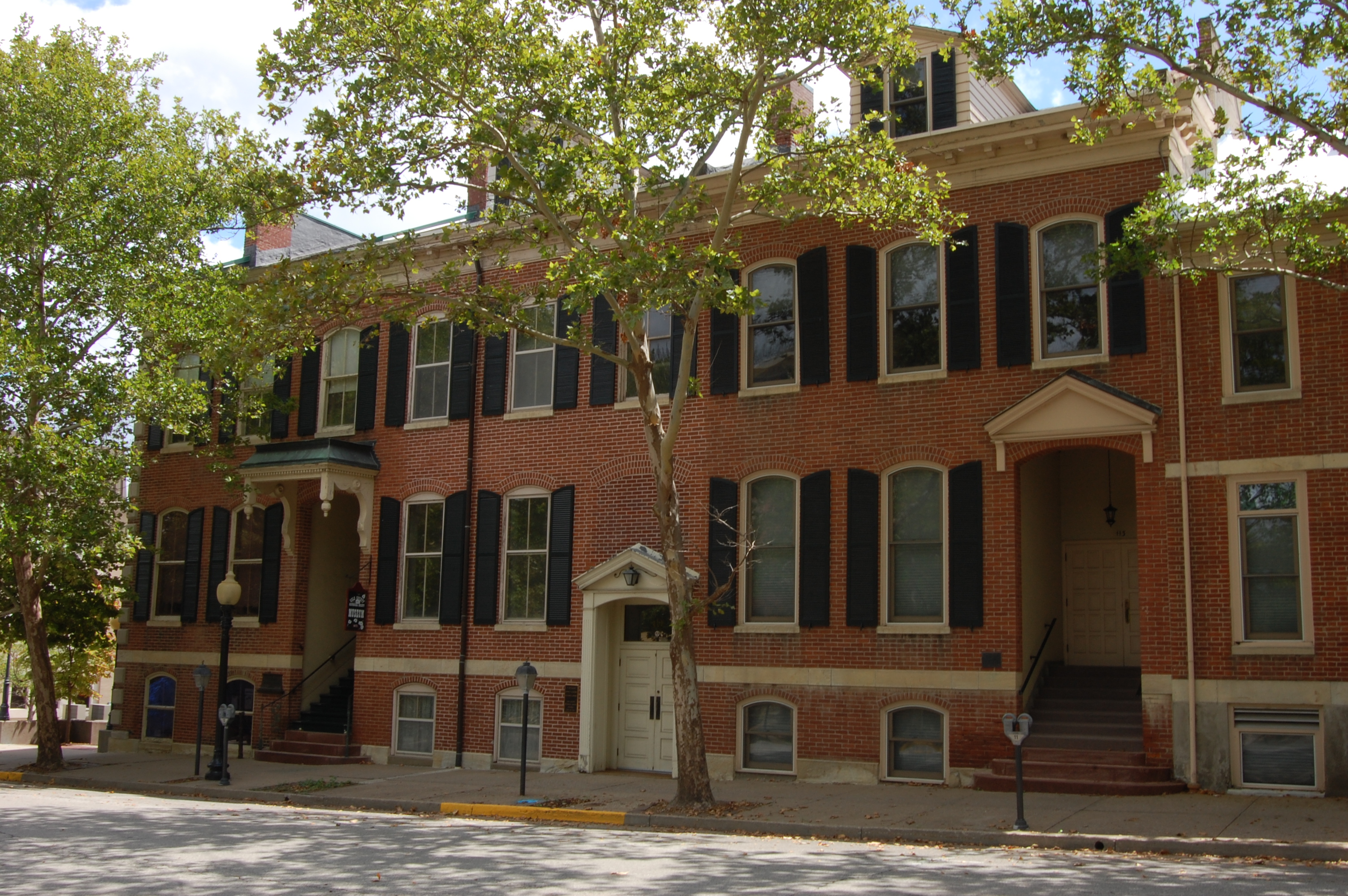
Cole County Historical Society Building in 2014

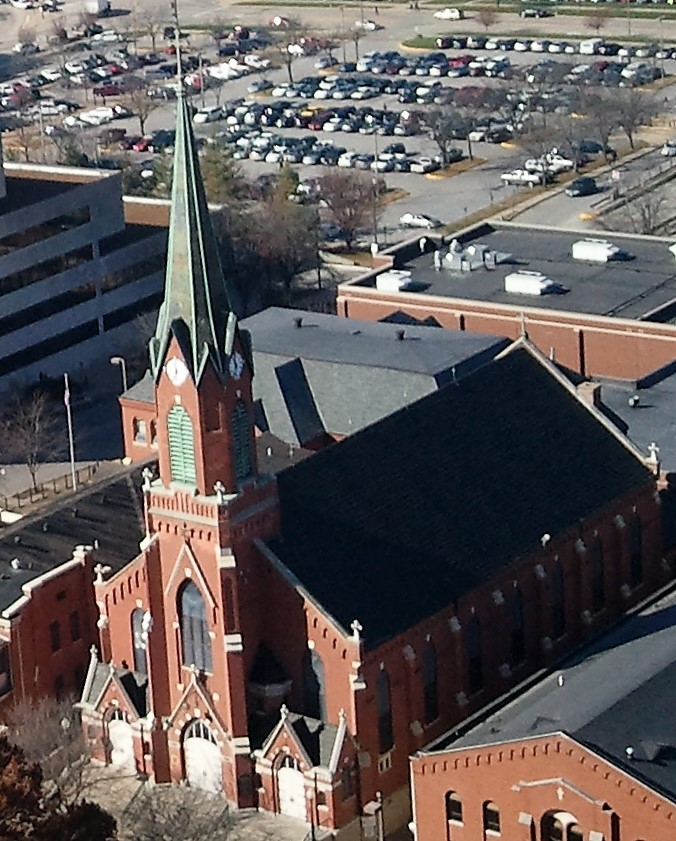
St. Peter's Catholic Church in 2012

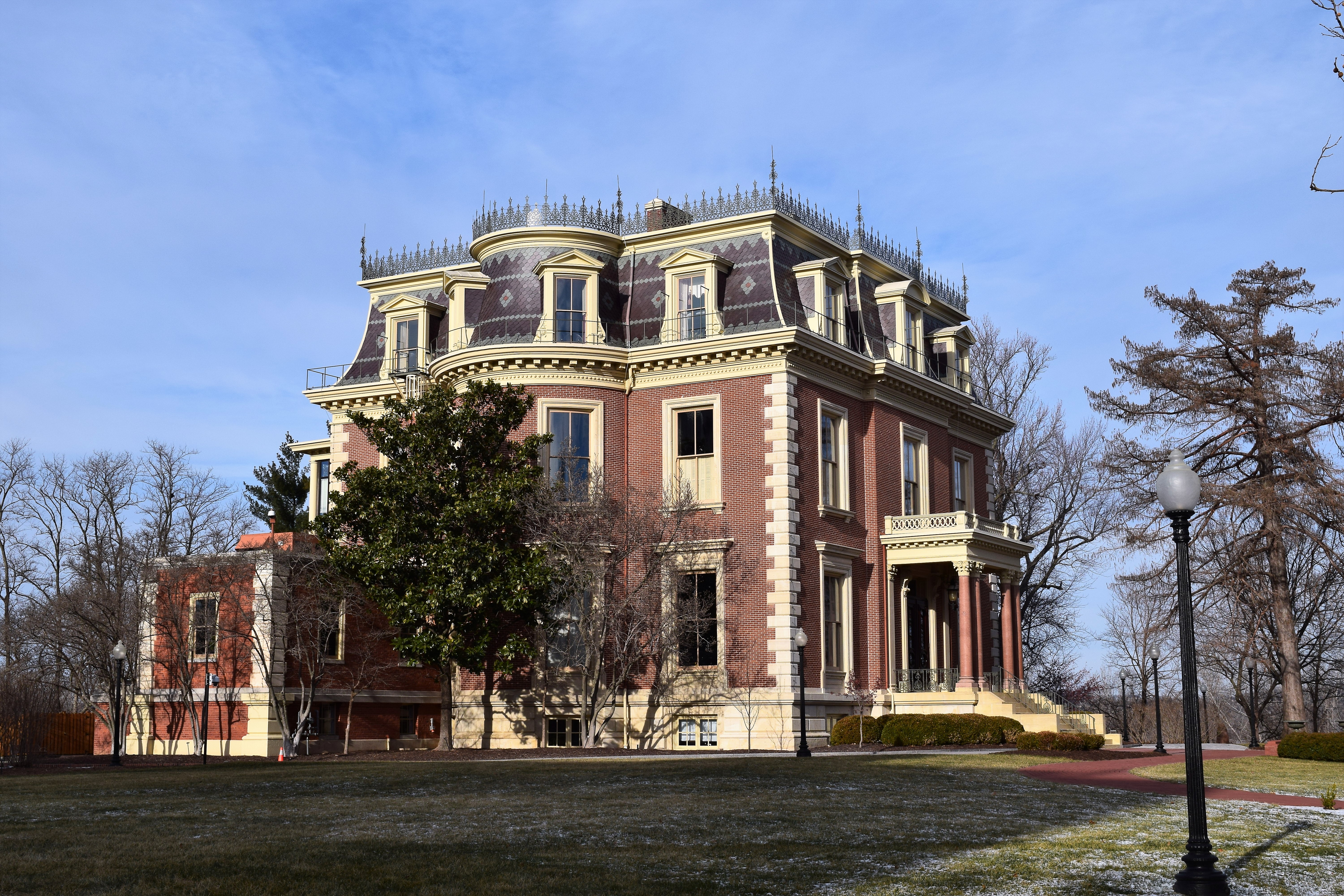
Missouri Governor's Mansion in 2017

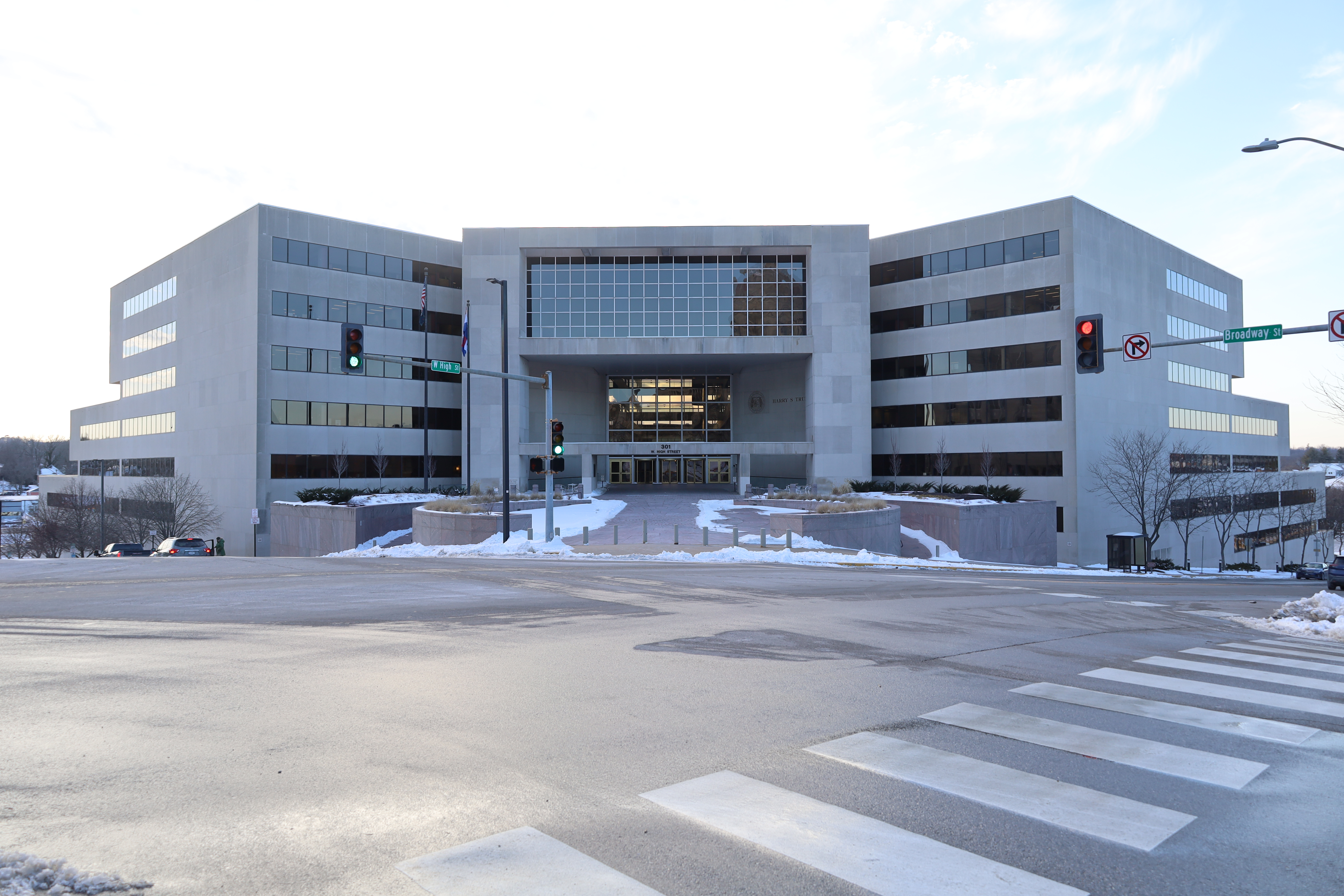
Harry S Truman State Office Building in 2025

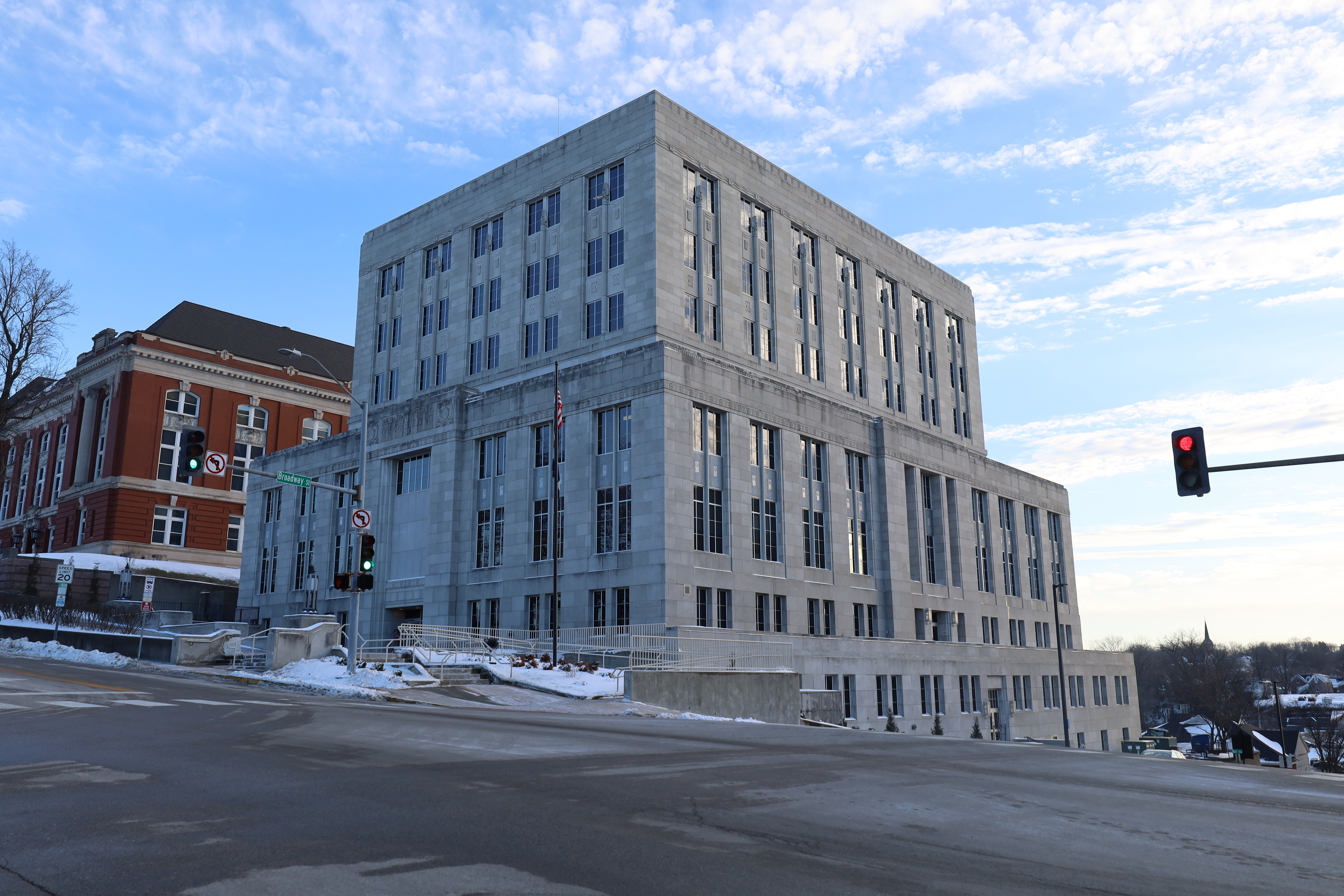
Broadway State Office Building in 2025

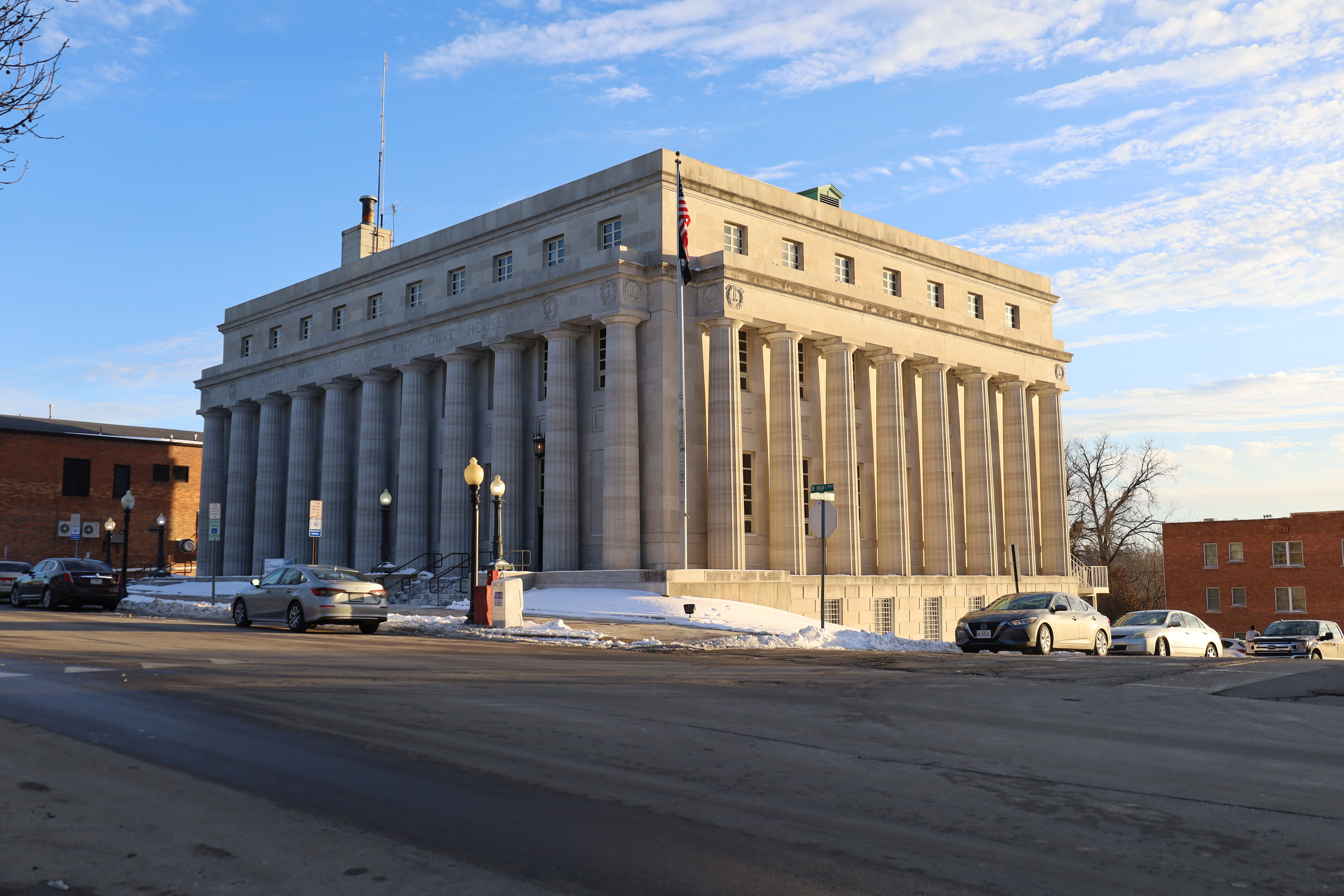
U.S. Post Office and Courthouse in 2025
