= Wave House =

House in Malibu, California designed by Harry Gesner

Coordinates: 34°02′31.58″N 118°54′27.08″W

Wave House was designed by architect Harry Gesner for old friends and fellow surfers Gerry and Glenn Cooper. Located on the beach in Malibu, California, the house is Gesner's most famous work. The design was highly regarded by Jørn Utzon, architect of the Sydney Opera House. Though denied by Gesner, the house is often cited as an influence on Utzon's design for the opera house.

== History ==
In 1956 Gesner was contacted by friends from his post-war time at Lake Arrowhead, Glenn and Gerry Cooper. The couple asked for his assistance in finding a coastal site in Malibu. They found a site with good surfing, and Gesner camped at the location.

According to Gesner, he paddled offshore on his surfboard and sketched the house's design in grease pencil on his surfboard, looking back at the site. Gesner wanted a shape like those found in the ocean, and used curved glue-laminated beams for the roof structure, with a shingled roof surface resembling fish scales.

The Wave House was designed in two parts, with the dramatic projecting beachfront living area surrounded by circular balconies, and a much plainer rectangular children's wing to the rear, against the hillside. The two sections enclose a landscaped interior court. Arrival was via a stairway and an underpass under the children's section to the courtyard, which serve as the formal entry. Gesner designed the house to extend into the surf at high tide. It was designed with projecting rooflines resembling breaking waves, cantilevered over the circular balconies. The interior focused on a central conversation pit and fireplace overlooking the ocean.

Wave House was later owned in the 1970s by Rod Stewart, who commissioned Gesner to design railings for the initially rail-less balconies. The house was further altered with the installation of large concrete piers to support it, since the retreat of the beachfront left it more exposed to ocean waves.

Stewart sold the house in 1987 to Warner Bros. executive Mo Ostin. Ostin swapped the pebble roof for copper shingles, which have since taken on a natural patina that matches the coastal color palette. After Ostin's death in 2022, his family listed the house for $49.5 million. The property was purchased by Joshua Kushner and Karlie Kloss for $29.5 million in August 2024.

Gesner's residence, the Sandcastle House, is next door.

== Recognition ==
The Wave House has received widespread attention. When Danish architect Jørn Utzon submitted his concept for the Sydney Opera House design competition, with sail or wave-like forms, his design was compared to Gesner's, and in the early 1960s Utzon called Gesner to express his appreciation for Gesner's work. Neither architect felt that the Opera House design was influenced by Wave House, but both acknowledged each other's work. In 2024, Gesner's son told The Guardian that Utzon had personally phoned his father and told him that "in a lot of ways, my father's wave house design inspired him."

The house was featured in the 2019 movie Yesterday.
