= Tim Progosh =

Canadian actor

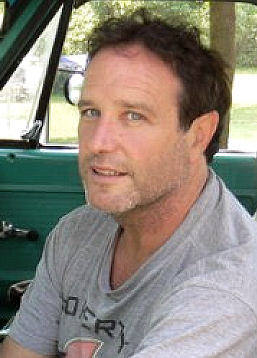
- Tim on set in 2005
- Born: Timothy Jeffrey Progosh; December 21, 1957 (age 68); Ottawa, Ontario, Canada
- Education: University of Western Ontario (Political Science, Drama)
- Occupations: Actor, TV producer, creator of the Canadian Comedy Awards and Hall of Fame
- Years active: 1983–present

Tim Progosh (born December 21, 1957) is a Canadian actor and the creator and original producer of the Canadian Comedy Awards, an annual awards presentation that celebrates Canadian comedy in a variety of media (TV, radio, film, the Internet, etc.) inaugurated in 2000.

His most notable roles include Principal Bill Kremeza in the 2015 award-winning film Spotlight, which won the Academy Award for Best Picture with Best Original Screenplay at the 88th Academy Awards (2016), and the ensemble cast character Firouz in the TV series The Adventures of Sinbad (1996–1998).

Progosh graduated with a Double Honors degree in Political Science and Drama from the University of Western Ontario. His first job was as a lobbyist for the Canadian Federal Government, but switched permanently to acting and stand-up comedy in 1981. He studied screenwriting at Algonquin College in Ottawa and improvisational acting at The Second City in Toronto.

== Filmography ==
Films/TV Films

- 1990: Prom Night III: The Last Kiss (1990) as Other Reporter
- 1990: Christmas in America (TV Movie) as Young Kenny Rogers (age 22)
- 1991: Thick as Thieves as Yuppie
- 1992: To Catch a Killer (TV Movie) Delta Squad Detective Jack Morris
- 1993: Life with Mikey as Lawyer Norman Feller
- 1994: Back in Action as Kasajian's assistant
- 1994: The Babymaker: The Dr. Cecil Jacobson Story (TV Movie) as Mr. Black
- 1995: Net Worth (TV Movie) as Player #3
- 1996: The Abduction (TV Movie) as Robert
- 1996: Remembrance (TV Movie) as Clem Stafford
- 1997: Shadow Zone: My Teacher Ate My Homework as Jesse's Dad
- 1999: The Corruptor as Lackey
- 1999: A Touch of Hope (TV Movie) as Joshua Peterson
- 2000: A Tale of Two Bunnies (TV Movie) as Comedian
- 2000: The Sandy Bottom Orchestra (TV Movie) as Cecil Bateman
- 2001: Jet Jackson: The Movie (TV Movie) as Sylvester (uncredited)
- 2001: Who Is Cletis Tout? (2001) as Young Micah
- 2003: The Gospel of John as The Master of the Feast
- 2004: I Downloaded a Ghost (TV Movie) as Walter Blackstone
- 2004: The Good Shepherd as Phillip Patterson
- 2005: Confession of an American Bride (TV Movie) (uncredited)
- 2012: Channelled Lives (Short) as Warren
- 2015: Spotlight as Principal Bill Kemeza
- 2018: eHero as Scotty Malloy
- 2019: Goalie as J.E. Norris
- 2020: Love at Look Lodge as Russel

Television Series

- 1987: Degrassi Junior High (1987) as Policeman
- 1990-1991: Street Legal as Reporter Tim
- 1994: Robocop: The Series (1994) as Mark McAdam
- 1995: The X-Files as Mr. Fielding
- 1996-1998: The Adventures of Sinbad as Firouz
- 1998-2001: First Wave as Dean Hormeth
- 1999: The Outer Limits as Walter Black
- 1999: Cold Squad as Father Geddes
- 1999: Twice in a Lifetime as Gary Ray
- 2000: Relic Hunter as Angus MacEvoy
- 2000: Code Name: Eternity as Scientist Cross
- 2001: Super Rupert as Sheriff Dave Patterson
- 2001: Within These Walls as Emily's Father
- 2003: Doc as Art Lang
- 2004: 1-800-Missing as Dr. Benson
- 2011: Covert Affairs as Doctor
- 2013: Murdoch Mysteries (2013) Mr. Edgar Leeman

As Producer

- 2000: The 2000 Canadian Comedy Awards (TV Special) (producer)
- 2001: The 2nd Annual Canadian Comedy Awards (TV Special) (producer)
- 2002: The 3rd Annual Canadian Comedy Awards (Video) (producer)
- 2002: Sketch Troop (TV Series) (producer)
- 2003: The Road to Funny (TV Movie documentary) (executive producer) / (producer)
- 2003: The 4th Annual Canadian Comedy Awards (TV Special) (producer)
- 2004: The 5th Annual Canadian Comedy Awards (TV Special) (producer)
- 2005: The 6th Annual Canadian Comedy Awards (TV Special) (producer)
- 2006: The 7th Annual Canadian Comedy Awards (TV Special) (producer)
- 2007: The Naughty Show (TV Special) (executive producer)
- 2007: The Nice Show (TV Special) (executive producer)
- 2007: The 8th Annual Canadian Comedy Awards (TV Special) (producer)
- 2008: The Canadian Comedy Awards: Best of the Fest 2007 (TV Special) (producer)
- 2008: The 9th Annual Canadian Comedy Awards (TV Special) (producer)
- 2009: The 10th Annual Canadian Comedy Awards (TV Special) (executive producer) / (producer)
- 2010: The 11th Annual Canadian Comedy Awards (TV Special) (producer)
- 2011: The 12th Annual Canadian Comedy Awards (TV Special) (executive producer)
- 2012: The 13h Annual Canadian Comedy Awards (executive producer)
- 2013: The 14th Annual Canadian Comedy Awards (executive producer)
- 2014: The 15th Annual Canadian Comedy Awards (executive producer)
- 2015: The 16th Annual Canadian Comedy Awards (executive producer)

As Writer

- 2002: The 2nd Annual Canadian Comedy Awards (TV Special)
- 2006: George Canyon's Christmas (TV Special)
- 2009: The 10th Annual Canadian Comedy Awards (TV Special)
