= I Downloaded a Ghost =

2004 television film

- Written by: Jeff Phillips
- Directed by: Kelly Sandefur
- Starring: Carlos Alazraqui; Elliot Page (Note: Credited as Ellen Page; Page came out as transgender and changed his name in 2020.)
- Country of origin: Canada
- Original language: English

Production
- Producer: Jim O'Grady
- Running time: 90 minutes
- Production companies: PorchLight Entertainment; PorchLight Pictures; Edge Entertainment; Videal

Original release
- Release: April 6, 2004

I Downloaded a Ghost is a 2004 Canadian fantasy comedy film starring Carlos Alazraqui as Winston the Ghost and Elliot Page as Stella Blackstone.

== Plot ==
Stella Blackstone (Elliot Page) and her best friend Albert (Michael Kanev) are twelve-year-olds with ambitious intentions of creating an extremely spooky Halloween house. While checking for hints online they open up a web link that opens a doorway through which an annoying ghost (Carlos Alazraqui) leaves his world and enters theirs. They find they must help this ghost resolve his problems or put up with him forever.

== Cast ==
- Carlos Alazraqui as Winston Pritchett
- Elliot Page as Stella Blackstone
- Michael Kanev as Albert
- Barbara Alyn Woods as Catherine Blackstone
- Tim Progosh as Walter Blackstone
- Gary Hudson as Fred Tomlinson
- Vince Corazza as Jared
- Allison Knight as Jennifer #1
- Landon Peters as Stone Savage
- Meghan Diane as Aunt Sally
- Tyler Baptist as Highschool Student

== See also ==
- List of films set around Halloween
