= Tergin Apartment Building =

- U.S. National Register of Historic Places
- U.S. Historic district – Contributing property
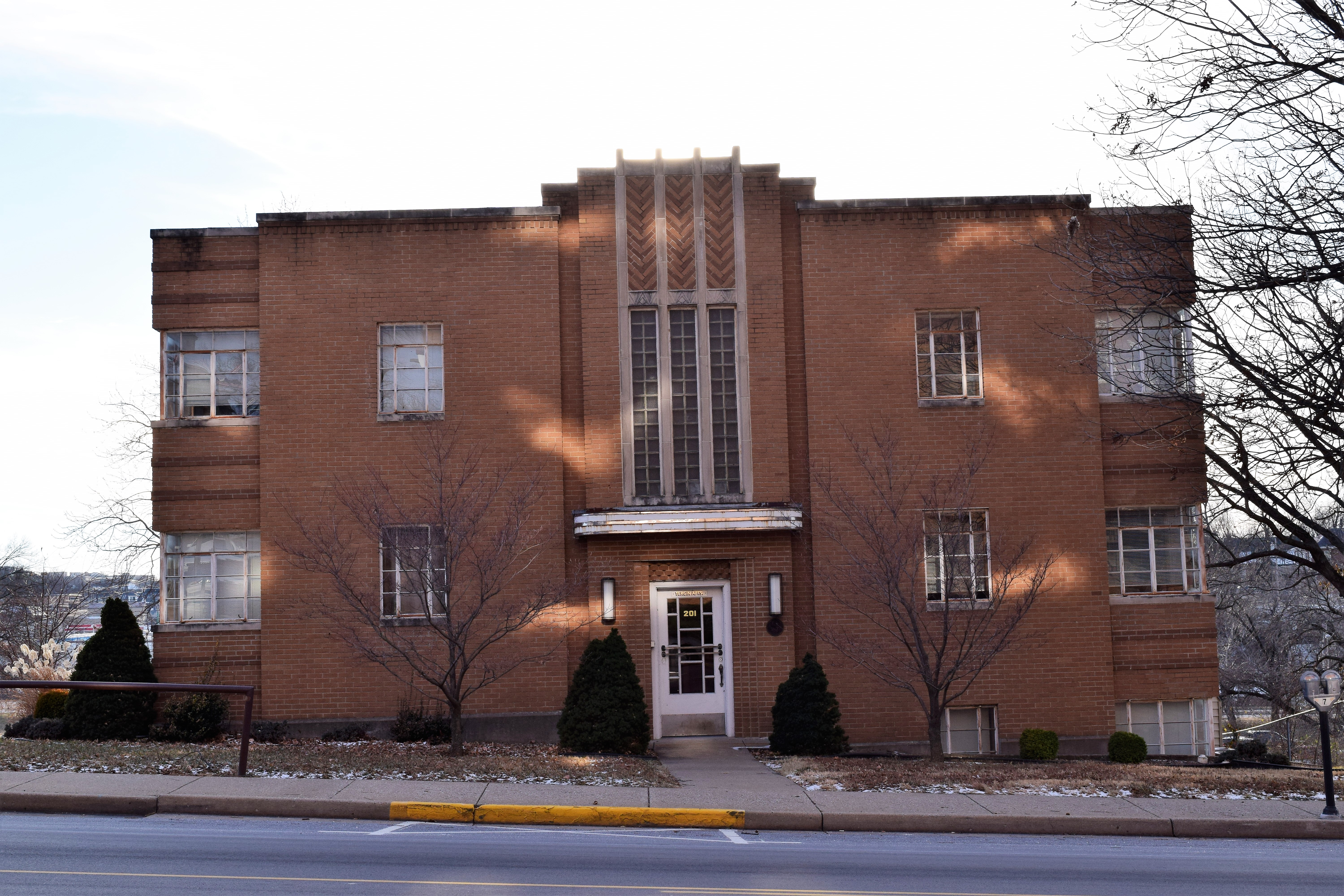

- Location within Missouri Location within the United States
- Location: 201 W. McCarty St., Jefferson City, Missouri
- Coordinates: 38°34′37″N 92°10′31″W
- Area: less than one acre
- Built: 1938-1939
- Built by: Lee Schell Construction Company
- Architect: Besecke and Swanson
- Architectural style: Art Deco, Moderne
- NRHP reference No.: 99000475
- Added to NRHP: April 22, 1999

Tergin Apartment Building, also known as Tergin Apartments , is a historic apartment building located at Jefferson City, Cole County, Missouri. It was built in 1938–1939, and is a two-story brick walkup apartment building with a full basement. It measures 50 feet wide by 35 feet deep and features Art Deco and Streamline Moderne design elements.

It was listed on the National Register of Historic Places in 1999. It is located in the Missouri State Capitol Historic District.
