= Cole House (Los Angeles) =

Coordinates: 34.096553°N 118.374411°W

The Cole House was designed in 1957 by architect Harry Gesner for swimwear executive Fred Cole, in Los Angeles, California.

In 1957 Gesner was introduced to recently-divorced swimwear manufacturer Fred Cole, who had bought a difficult site overlooking Hollywood and the Los Angeles basin, in the hills above the Sunset Strip. Cole wanted an exotic house that could serve as a set for photo shoots featuring his swimwear products. Built in six months to meet a deadline for the showing of the new Cole of California collection, the house was described by contemporary writers as an "inverted V," resembling what later became known as the A-frame.

Cole, who spent half of the year in Tahiti, wanted a house that combined the character of an island with a mountain lodge. This was in contrast to his previous houses, which had reflected the tastes of his former wife more than his. Gesner followed his by-now established practice of using glue-laminated beams on concrete piers with dramatic roof elements to enclose the space and direct views. In response to Cole's desire that the house be suitable for photo shoots with swimsuit models to support Cole's business, the house was designed with a generous plaza, with palm trees, a swimming pool, and a fire pit, all overlooking Sunset Boulevard. According to Gesner, "My assignment was to create an environment for a bachelor who had beautiful women coming in and out of his life all the time." Gesner was at the time working with Marlon Brando to redesign Brando's house on Mulholland Drive to more closely resemble Brando's island retreat on Tetiaroa. The house was built by a team of Norwegian shipbuilders who would go on to build Gesner's Hollywood Hills Boathouses on similarly difficult sites.

The house, Cole, and Gesner received extensive publicity due to Cole's promotional activities, and the house was featured in True magazine.
