= Alexander F. Harmer =

American painter (1856–1925)

- Born: Alexander Francis Harmer; 1856; Newark, New Jersey, U.S.
- Died: January 10, 1925 (aged 68–69); Santa Barbara, California, U.S.
- Education: Pennsylvania Academy of Fine Arts
- Occupations: Painter, photographer

Alexander Francis Harmer (1856 – January 10, 1925) was an American painter in Southern California. He has been described as the first prominent painter of California. Works by Harmer are part of several major collections.

== Biography ==
Harmer was born in 1856 in Newark, New Jersey. He began painting early, supposedly selling his first work at the age of 11 for two dollars. At 16 he joined the army, and was stationed to California. After a year he requested a discharge on grounds of being underage, working as a photographic assistant before enrolling at the Pennsylvania Academy of Fine Art in 1874. Short of money, he again enlisted in the army in 1881, and was assigned to Troop L of the Sixth Cavalry at Fort Apache, Arizona. During his time in the army, his unit pursued the Chiricahua Apache and Geronimo, their chief. Harmer took advantage of the army service, traveling in the American West and photographing Native Americans and Western life, before again returning to the Pennsylvania Academy.

Harmer moved to California in 1891. There in 1893 he married Felicidad Abadie, of a prominent Santa Barbara Californio family. The couple settled in the Abadie family residence, the Yorba-Abadie adobe, which under Alexander and Felicidad's patronage became an artists' colony. Harmer developed sketches and photographs from his army travels into oil paintings. He contributed illustrations to Harpers Weekly and other magazines, acquiring a reputation as a western artist, and as a leader of the California art community.

Alexander and Felicidad had seven children. Their eldest daughter Inez married Jack Northrop, founder of the Northrop Corporation. Their eldest son Alexander Bertrand ("Bert") Harmer (1896 – 1967) became a prominent Santa Barbara architect.

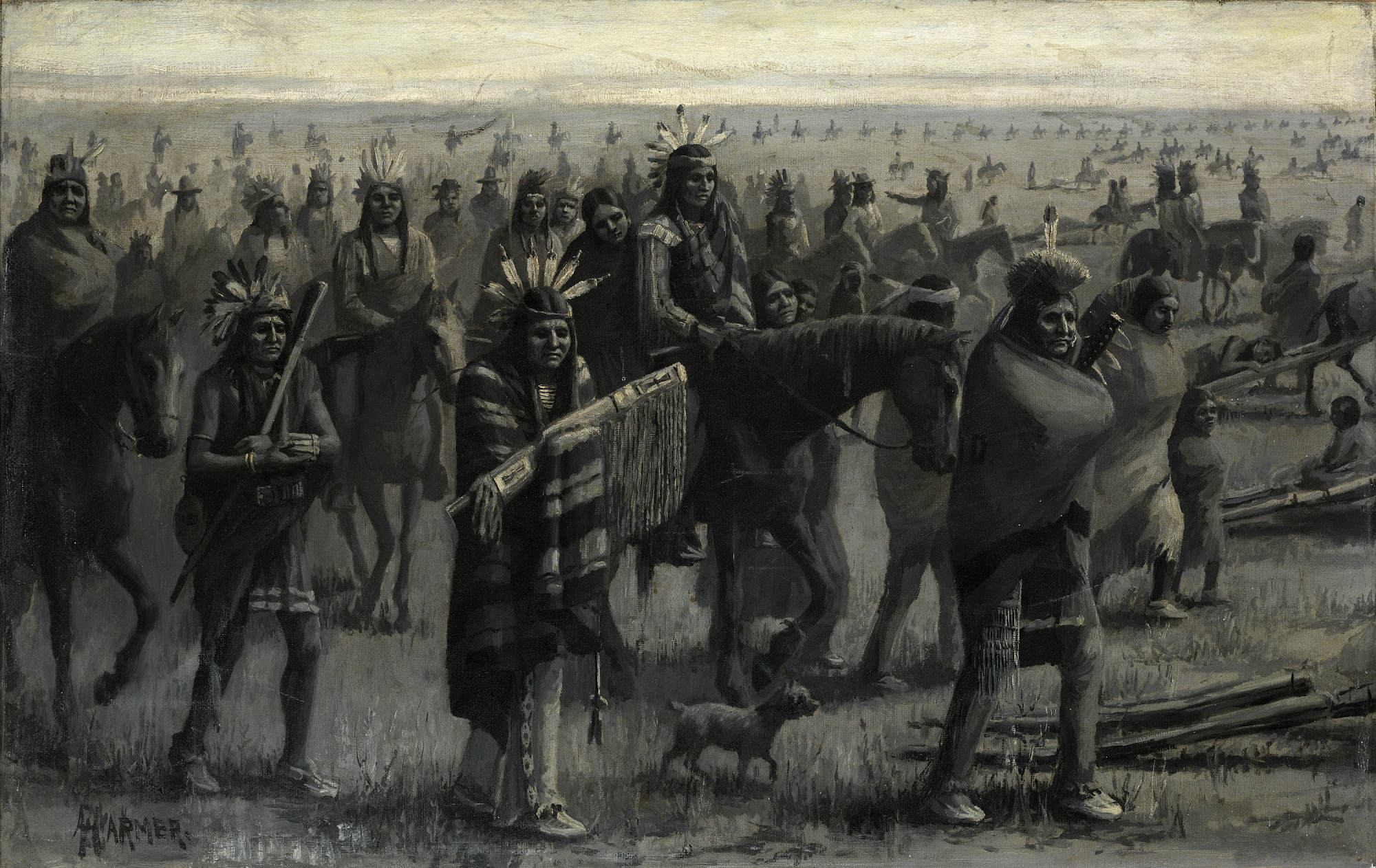
Indians Migrating, in the Smithsonian Museum of American Art

Harmer died on January 10, 1925.

Several permanent museum collections contain Harmer's work, including the Smithsonian Museum of American Art, the Blanton Museum of Art, and the Crocker Art Museum.

== See also ==
- Harry Gesner, son of Harmer's daughter Ethel. Gesner was a notable California architect who apprenticed with his uncle Bert Harmer
