= Zen Gesner =

American actor

- Born: Zen Martin Gesner; June 23, 1970 (age 56); Van Nuys, California, U.S.
- Education: London Academy of Music and Dramatic Art
- Occupation: Actor
- Years active: 1994–Active
- Spouse: Cynthia Farrelly Gesner (m. 1995)
- Children: 3
- Parent(s): Harry Gesner; Nan Martin

Zen Brant Gesner (born June 23, 1970)is an American television and movie actor. He is perhaps most recognized for his roles as Sinbad in the syndicated television series The Adventures of Sinbad, and was a regular cast member on the ABC daytime drama All My Children as Braden Lavery.

== Early life ==
Gesner was born in Van Nuys, California, the son of stage actress Nan Martin and architect Harry Gesner. His parents named him after the Japanese Buddhist sect that preaches enlightenment through meditation. He has an older half-brother, Casey Martin Dolan, from his mother's first marriage to musician Robert E. Dolan, and two older half-siblings from his father's prior marriages, Jason Gesner (Hydroelectric Manager), and Tara Tanzer-Cartwright (Teacher).

Gesner was interested in music as a boy, and plays both the piano and trumpet. He became an aspiring actor while attending Santa Monica High School after landing a small part in the school's production of Hamlet, and went on to play leading roles in the school's rendition of "Nicholas Nickleby" and "The Sound of Music". Upon graduation, Gesner joined South Coast Repertory Theatre in Orange County, CA, performing in small roles and watching experienced actors ply their craft.

== Career ==
After touring the audition circuit, Gesner sought admission to LAMDA's intensive summer programme on Shakespeare and was accepted. Towards the end of the course, he was offered a position in the general three-year programme at the Academy, whose North American alumni include such actors as Alexis Denisof, John Lithgow and Donald Sutherland.

As a student at LAMDA, Gesner not only performed in such plays as Richard III, The Cherry Orchard and Anything Goes, but also studied everything from poetry to archery to fire-blowing. He especially excelled in fencing and during his second year, earned an advanced certificate from The Society of British Fight Directors. Post-graduation from the Academy, the actor worked as Assistant Fight Director to the Royal Opera, London. Gesner made his feature film debut in Dumb & Dumber and put his real-life surfing skills to use as a surfer in the Chris Isaak music video, "Somebody's Crying".

After four auditions and a screen test, Gesner won the title role in the syndicated fantasy-action series, The Adventures of Sinbad. The series was filmed in Cape Town, South Africa, and involved heavy stuntwork and use of special effects. Between shoots, Gesner added to his physical performance skills by picking up tricks from a local circus troupe, such as tightrope walking, inverted rope-climbing, kicking/flipping up from the ground (known as "kipping"), and stunt flips. Although listed on the fall lineup for a third season, the well-rated series ended its run after the second season due to contract disputes between the production company and series distributors.

Since the conclusion of Sinbad in 1998, Gesner has appeared on television series such as Friends and All My Children. He played the role of David Patrick in the 2005 movie The Ringer, a film about the Special Olympics. He was also the spokesperson for Chicken Of The Sea's 2005 "What Women Want" marketing campaign.

Gesner is brother-in-law to the Farrelly Brothers, and has received several small roles in their movies, including Dumb & Dumber, Fever Pitch, Kingpin, Me, Myself & Irene, Osmosis Jones, Shallow Hal and There's Something About Mary. Gesner also played (Ron) a gay man in the movie Boat Trip. He appeared in the Man Laws commercials for Miller Lite.

Gesner was the "Mystery Man" in the opening of each episode of Take the Money & Run. He hands the briefcase containing $100,000 to the two-person team of contestants and relays instructions.

== Personal life ==
Gesner moved back to the United States, where he met and married his wife Cynthia Farrelly Gesner (sister of the writer-directors Peter and Bobby Farrelly) in 1995. They moved to Hollywood, where Gesner worked part-time in construction while auditioning for television and movie roles.

They have three sons: Finn Harry Gesner (b. July 24, 1997 in Cape Town, South Africa), Rory Farrelly Gesner (b. October 9, 2000 in Santa Monica, California, and Tuck John Gesner (b. July 11, 2003 in Santa Monica, California). Gesner currently resides with his family in Malibu, California.
