= Cole Hotel =

- Formerly listed on the U.S. National Register of Historic Places
- Location within North Dakota Location within the United States
- Location: 401-407 Northern Pacific Ave., Fargo, North Dakota
- Coordinates: 46°52′34″N 96°47′3″W
- Area: less than 1 acre (0.40 ha)
- Built: 1909
- NRHP reference No.: 83001928

Significant dates
- Added to NRHP: May 9, 1983
- Removed from NRHP: October 21, 2009

Cole Hotel, also known as Cole European Hotel, was a hotel in Fargo, North Dakota, United States. The hotel building was listed on the National Register of Historic Places in 1983 and was removed from the National Register in 2009.

Edward Cole entered the hotel business following the 1893 Fargo fire which destroyed all the first class hotels in the city.
