= Fairfax Theatre =

Los Angeles theatre building

Coordinates: 34°4′35″N 118°21′42″W

Fairfax Theatre is a mixed-use building located in Los Angeles's Fairfax District on the northwest corner of Fairfax Avenue and Beverly Boulevard. It was constructed in 1930 is recognized for its Art Deco architecture and its importance to Jewish heritage in the area. It was declared a Los Angeles Historic-Cultural Monument in 2021.

== History ==
Completed in 1930, Fairfax Theatre was the first movie theater and one of the first commercial and professional buildings in the Beverly-Fairfax neighborhood. The building was developed by Nelson C. Stein, who owned it until 1960, and from 1930 to 1969, it hosted numerous fundraisers for local synagogues (including Etz Jacob and Fairfax Temple in 1933 and Western Jewish Institute in 1934), temples, clubs, and charities, as well as fundraisers to support the migration of Jewish cultural institutions from Boyle Heights. Beverly-Fairfax Jewish Community Center also raised funds in the building; they held their first benefits here in 1935, eight years prior to the organization's opening.

Businesses catering to the area's Jewish population began appearing on Fairfax starting with Fairfax Theatre in 1930 and accelerating greatly after World War II. Fairfax Theatre, which also features thirteen storefronts, was home to Fairfax's first Jewish deli, its first Jewish bakery, and its first kosher meat market.

Fairfax Theatre opened on March 26, 1930 with the premiere of Troopers Three starring Rex Lease. The theater was leased to the Fairfax Theatre Company, Inc who also operated several other theaters in Los Angeles. Well-known celebrities often performed at Fairfax Theatre, including Eddie Cantor, George Jessel, and Gene Autry.

The theater shut down in 2010 and was left vacant for more than a decade. A proposed redevelopment was approved c. 2013.

=== Preservation ===
In 2010, preservationists tried to designate Fairfax Theatre as historic, but the Los Angeles Cultural Heritage Commission denied the application. Since then, new information about the extensive history of the building and its cultural significance to the Jewish community was discovered, and on July 30, 2021, the State Historic Resources Commission voted unanimously to add the theater to the National Register of Historic Places. The nomination was supported by members of UCLA's Mapping Jewish LA Project, the president of Hadassah of Southern California, Holocaust Museum LA, and city-council member Paul Koretz.

Los Angeles City Council voted unanimously to add Fairfax Theatre to the list of Historic-Cultural Monuments on December 7, 2021. The Art Deco Society of Los Angeles teamed with Save Beverly Fairfax to achieve this designation, which was filed by preservationist Steven Luftman. Los Angeles Conservancy, Hollywood Heritage, and Los Angeles Historic Theatre Foundation were key supporters.

== Design ==
On October 20, 1929, the Los Angeles Times announced that William Simpson & Co. had begun construction on the theater, with a capacity of 1,500 seats at a cost of $150,000 ($2.81 million in 2025). The building was designed by W. C. Pennel, who designed hundreds of commercial and residential projects in Los Angeles. Fairfax Theatre retains all aspects of historic integrity and integrity of workmanship.

The primary façades utilize a repeating angled motif that creates a strong zig-zag aesthetic typical of Art Deco architecture. The marquee is supported by its original iron braces and consists of neon lights and Plexiglas lettering; it also features a coffered ceiling inset, a sunburst pattern, and recessed lights. The entrance consists of a large open lobby surfaced with red tile and reeded pilasters, and it also contains a starburst pattern in its terrazzo flooring. A Regency-style ticket booth decorates the front of the lobby.

The main theater is the most intact portion of the building. It retains the original proscenium arch and decorative organ screens, the latter of which consists of a lattice of interlocking chevrons and diamonds painted gold. The theater exits, dated from 1946, are topped by two large rococo scroll pelmets. The ceiling, made of metal lathe and plaster, consists of a recessed central panel framed with a decorative cornice around an Art Deco metal light fixture.
