= Cole County Historical Society Building =

- U.S. National Register of Historic Places
- U.S. Historic district – Contributing property
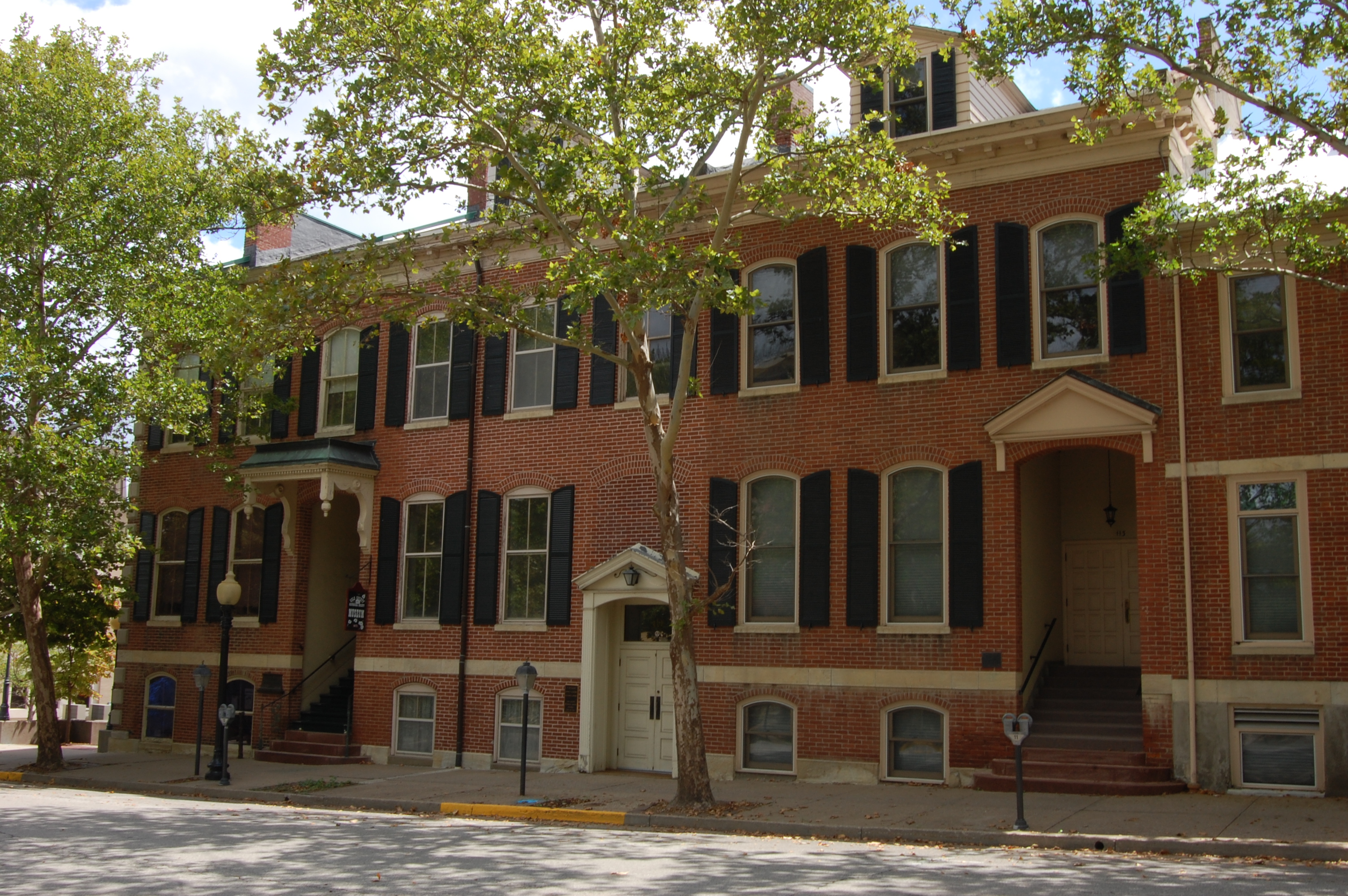
- Cole County Historical Society Building, August 2014

- Location within Missouri Location within the United States
- Location: 109 Madison St., Jefferson City, Missouri
- Coordinates: 38°34′38″N 92°10′9″W
- Area: 0 acres (0 ha)
- Built: 1871
- Architectural style: Late Victorian
- NRHP reference No.: 69000093
- Added to NRHP: May 21, 1969

Cole County Historical Society Building, also known as the B. Gratz Brown House, is a historic building located at Jefferson City, Cole County, Missouri. It was built in 1871, and is a two-story, Victorian style, brick rowhouse. It is three bays wide and features segmental arched windows. It was renovated in 1948.

It was listed on the National Register of Historic Places in 1969. It is located in the Missouri State Capitol Historic District.
