= Cole House (Paris, Idaho) =

Historic house in Idaho, United States

- U.S. National Register of Historic Places
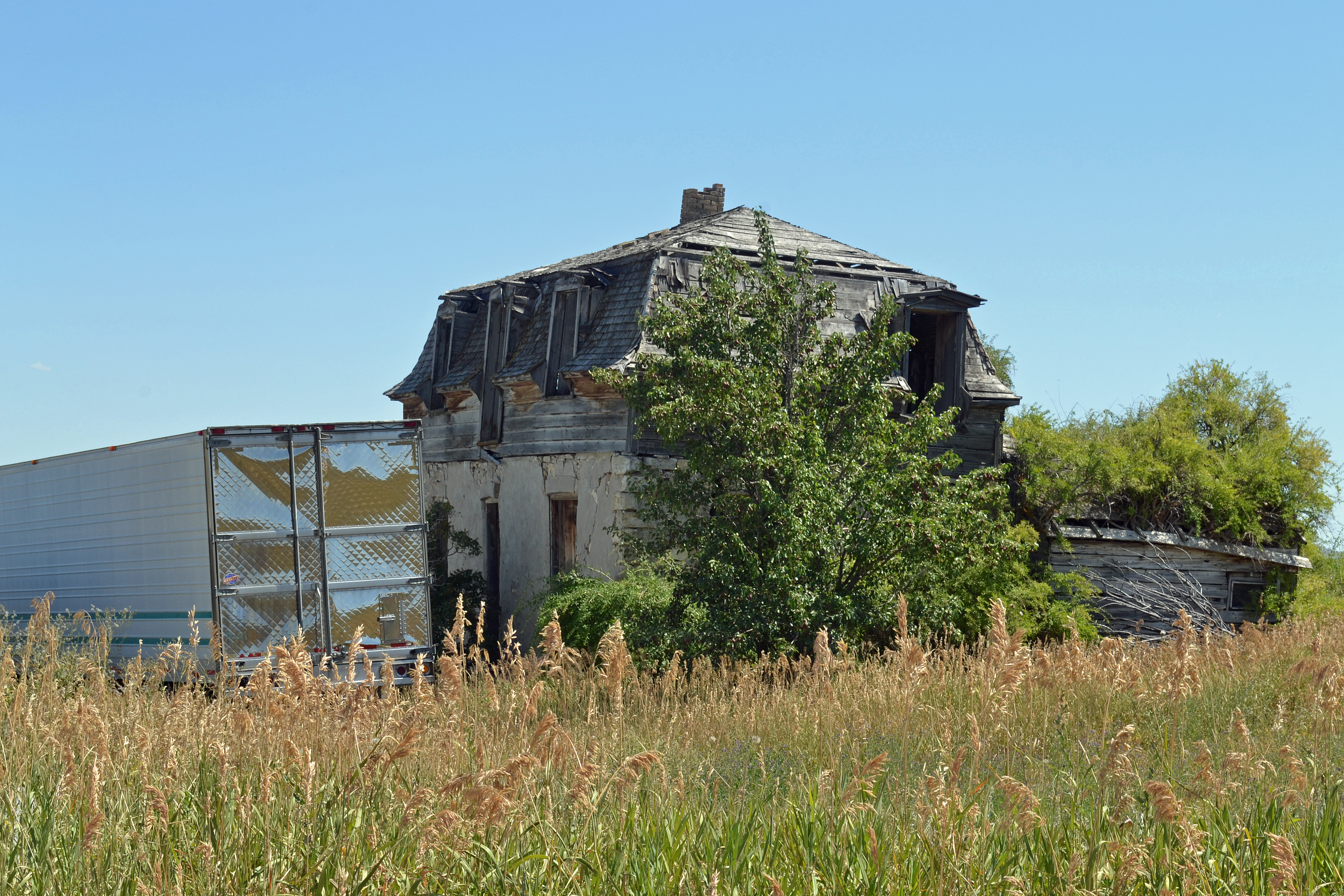

- Location within Idaho Location within the United States
- Nearest city: Paris, Idaho
- Coordinates: 42°13′0″N 111°24′35″W
- Area: less than one acre
- Built by: Tueller, Jacob
- Architectural style: Second Empire
- MPS: Paris MRA
- NRHP reference No.: 82000269
- Added to NRHP: November 18, 1982

The Cole House near Paris, Idaho was listed on the National Register of Historic Places in 1982.

It was deemed "architecturally significant as the only building in Paris, besides the Tabernacle, to exhibit local stone masonry and as one of two mansard-roofed houses, of the six nominated in Paris, to remain essentially unaltered."
