= Cynthia Farrelly Gesner =

American actress and attorney

- Born: Cynthia Farrelly
- Occupation(s): Film actress, entertainment lawyer
- Spouse: Zen Gesner (m. 1997)
- Children: 3

Cynthia Farrelly Gesner is an American film actress and entertainment lawyer, known for appearing in the film Kingpin which was directed by her brothers Bobby and Peter Farrelly.

== Education ==
Gesner graduated from Tufts University with a Bachelor of Arts degree in 1984 and went on to graduate from Boston University School of Law in 1988. She currently works in entertainment law.

== Filmography ==
- Kingpin (1996) as Silver Legacy Maid
