= William I. Cole House =

Historic house in Wisconsin, United States

- U.S. National Register of Historic Places
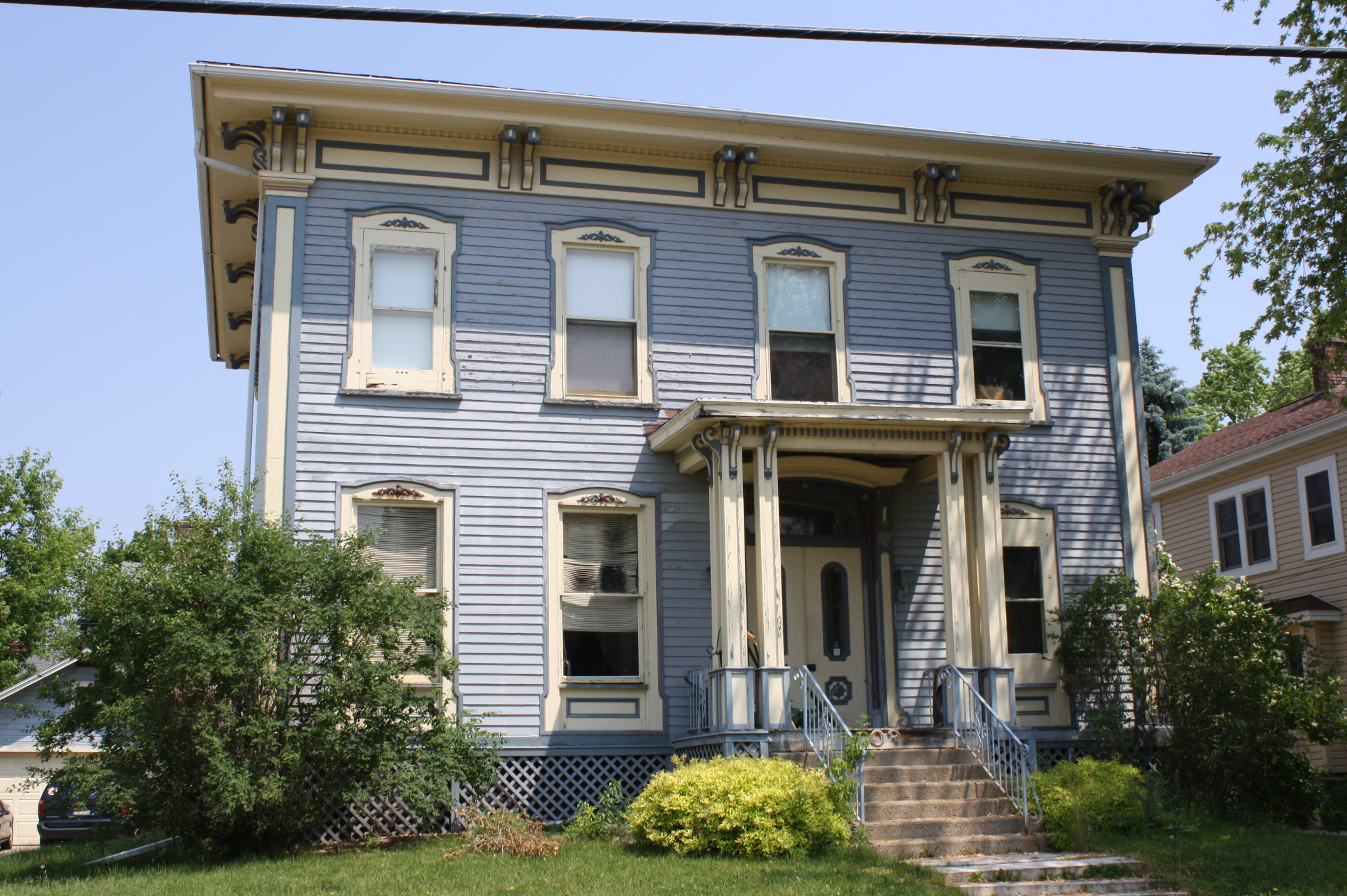
- William I. Cole House
- Location: 303 Gillett St., Fond du Lac, Wisconsin
- Coordinates: 43°46′41″N 88°26′09″W
- Area: less than one acre
- Built: 1857
- Architectural style: Italianate
- NRHP reference No.: 02000283
- Added to NRHP: March 28, 2002

The William I. Cole House is located in Fond du Lac, Wisconsin.

== History ==
This house was the home of William I. Cole, the Vice-President of the Cole Savings Bank, in the early twentieth century. The house was added to the State Register of Historic Places in 2001 and to the National Register of Historic Places the following year.

This two-story Italianate house has a hip roof, wide eaves, paired brackets, and a paneled frieze. The house also features clapboard siding and broad corner pilasters. Windows are generally single light sashes, and some on the second story have been enclosed somewhat. They are decorated with elaborate wooden surrounds. The front entrance features a double wood door with an arched transom that is decorated with a hood, brackets, and pilasters. The front porch has a flat roof supported by grouped thin square posts and brackets. On one of the side, walls are a two-story bay and oriel, both decorated with brackets and friezes. This house is a fine example of the Italianate style. The hip roof bracketed eves, frieze, and porch with thin posts are all typical elements of the style. This house also has the square form and massing seen on most Italianate houses. The corner pilasters are somewhat unusual, but overall, this house is a fine and well-built example of the style.
