= Harry Gesner =

American architect (1925–2022)

- Born: Harry Harmer Gesner; April 28, 1925; Oxnard, California, U.S.
- Died: June 10, 2022 (aged 97); Malibu, California, U.S.
- Occupation: Architect
- Years active: 1947–?
- Spouse: Nan Martin (m. 1970; died 2010)
- Children: 3, including Zen Gesner

Harry Harmer Gesner (April 28, 1925 – June 10, 2022) was an American architect from California. Gesner principally designed houses in the Los Angeles area, especially along the coast in Malibu.

Following service in the US Army during World War II, Gesner was a self-taught architect. Though denied by Gesner and Utzon, his Wave House (1957) has been proposed as an inspiration for Danish architect Jørn Utzon's Sydney Opera House. Gesner worked with difficult sites, often steeply sloping, on beaches, or in narrow canyons, using primarily natural materials. His houses usually featured strong, dominant roof lines and large expanses of glass oriented to specific views.

== Early life and military service ==
Gesner was born in Oxnard, California, the son of Ethel Harmer, an artist and daughter of early California artist Alexander F. Harmer, and Harry Gesner, an inventor and engineer. Gesner attended Santa Monica High School. Growing up in Southern California he learned to surf and water-ski. During his senior year he dated future actress June Lockhart, whom he met while water-skiing at Lake Arrowhead Reservoir. He also dated another future actress, Nan Martin, who would become his fourth wife.

Gesner enlisted in the U.S. Army at age 17, and because he was an accomplished skier, he was assigned to Camp Hale in Colorado as a ski instructor for the 10th Mountain Division. He transferred to the Army Air Corps, but was reassigned to the infantry and joined the 1st Infantry Division as a replacement. In ten days he was landed with the 1st Infantry at Omaha Beach in Normandy. An experienced California surfer, Gesner used his experience in surf to evade enemy fire. "If I hadn't surfed my whole life, there would have been no way I would have made it," Gesner later recounted. His company advanced through France to Aachen and the Seigfried Line. From Aachen the unit moved north to the Herken Forest in the Ardennes, where they were caught in the Battle of the Bulge. Gesner was detailed as a scout, and was hit at the outskirts of Cologne by close German tank fire. He lay injured in freezing weather overnight, later developing gangrene, and narrowly escaping the amputation of both legs. Discharged in 1944, he was repatriated to New York.

== Architectural career ==
On his return to the United States, Gesner stayed in the New York area for six months. He audited an architecture class at Yale University, whose visiting lecturer was Frank Lloyd Wright. Wright offered him a place at his Taliesin West school, but Gesner did not pursue it, going instead to Ecuador to look for pre-Columbian artifacts. From there he moved on to Mexico City, where Erroll Flynn asked him to help to move his yacht from Mexico back to the United States, but Gesner ended up going back to Los Angeles on his own. There he reunited with his girlfriend from New York, Audrey Hawthorne, who was by then nine months pregnant and staying with Gesner's parents in California. Gesner and Hawthorne married in Tijuana. Audrey returned to New York to resume her modeling career after their daughter was born. Gesner was hired by his uncle Bert Harmer to work with builders on three Harmer projects at Lake Arrowhead, gaining architectural and construction experience.

After a year of apprenticeship in construction, Gesner struck out on his own, designing houses for family members and acquaintances, and developing a reputation for unusual designs on challenging sites. He became a favorite architect for bachelor male clients who wanted exotic-looking designs. Gesner initially lived in Santa Monica in an apartment at his parents' house, in 1946 designing them a new adobe home in Tarzana that was built in 1950, the same year he also designed an adobe house for his newly-divorced aunt Inez Northrop in Santa Barbara. In 1950-51 the now-divorced Gesner met and married his second wife, Patty Townsend. Harry and Patty built their own house on land near his parents' new house, that his parents gave them in return for designing their house.

=== First notable projects ===
Gesner's first notable project was the Eagle's Watch house, designed for a client for whom Gesner had previously designed apartments. Gesner proposed the ambitious design for a difficult site above these apartments, which could only be reached by a funicular. Named for the eagle Gesner had repeatedly observed at the site, the 1957 house had a spreading wing-like roofline. This was followed by a commission Gesner obtained through Patty's connections. The Kimball House was designed in 1957 for a site in Tarzana, bridging the walls of a small canyon.

=== Cole House ===
In 1957 Gesner was introduced to recently-divorced swimwear manufacturer Fred Cole, who had bought a difficult site overlooking Hollywood and the Los Angeles basin. Cole wanted an exotic house that could serve as a set for photo shoots featuring his swimwear products. Built in six months to meet a deadline for the showing of the new Cole of California collection, the Cole House was described by contemporary writers as an "inverted V," resembling what later became known as the A-frame. The house received extensive publicity.

=== Wave House ===
In 1956 Gesner was contacted by friends from his post-war time at Lake Arrowhead, Glenn and Gerry Cooper. The couple asked for his assistance in finding a coastal site in Malibu. They found a site with good surfing, and Gesner camped at the location. According to Gesner, he paddled offshore on his surfboard and sketched the house's design in grease pencil on his surfboard, looking back at the site. Gesner designed the house to extend into the surf at high tide. The Wave House was designed with projecting rooflines resembling breaking waves, cantilevered over circular balconies. The interior focused on a central conversation pit and fireplace overlooking the ocean. The house received widespread attention. The same year, Danish architect Jørn Utzon submitted his concept for the Sydney Opera House design competition, with sail or wave-like forms. Utzon's design was compared to Gesner's, and in the early 1960s, Utzon called Gesner to express his appreciation for Gesner's work. Neither architect felt that the Opera House design was influenced by Wave House, but both acknowledged each others' work.

Wave House was later owned in the 1970s by Rod Stewart, who commissioned Gesner to design railings for the initially rail-less balconies.

=== Established practice ===
By 1958 Gesner had an established practice with repeat clients. For a client with 20 apparently unbuildable lots, Gesner designed the Hollywood Hills Boathouses, with street-level entrances on the uphill sides and dramatic views of the San Fernando Valley on the elevated downhill side. Gesner designed several additional speculative houses for the client, Ronald Buck, developing what Gesner called the W house. The central component of the W is similar to an A-frame, with wings supported on splayed frames rising from the base of the A. Following the pattern of the Boathouses, the houses are entered via an uphill street entrance, and the living spaces are oriented for views of the valley on the downhill side.

These projects were followed by a series of small houses on flat sites, with impressive views. The houses featured centralized themes, with fireplaces, sunken living rooms, or in one case an atrium with a pool in the center of the house. Shortly after these commissions, the now-divorced Gesner pursued a newly-divorced friend, Pat Alexander, and they were married by 1962. For several years, Harry and Pat lived in Switzerland, where Pat, a native Californian, had established a life. By 1966 the couple was divorced, and Gesner moved back to California and resumed his practice.

=== Commissions ===
Gesner's chief 1966 commission was the Scantlin House, commissioned as a bachelor residence for John Scantlin. Gesner's design for the site, which has a panoramic view of Los Angeles and the Pacific Ocean, featured a single large 1-inch (2.5 cm) thick pane of glass to frame the main view. The house also included an outdoor lap pool with an underwater entrance to a grotto in the master bathroom. The house was later acquired by the J. Paul Getty Trust and was used by architect Richard Meier while he designed the Getty Center.

From 1966 Gesner focused on circular designs. In 1968 Gesner reunited with former casual girlfriend Nan Martin, who moved in with him at Gesner's studio in Tarzana, becoming Gesner’s fourth wife. Fulfilling a promise to Martin, Gesner designed their house on a cove in Malibu close to the Wave House. The Sandcastle used circular forms, and gave Gesner access to surfing from his own beach. The house was primarily built of salvaged materials. There followed a series of Malibu beachfront commissions into the 1970s. Gesner continued to design houses on challenging and spectacular sites into the 1980s. Following a major 1993 wildfire in Malibu, Gesner designed a new house for playwright Jerome Lawrence, whose house had burned. Lawrence died in 2004 before the house was completed, and the design was changed by subsequent owners. A subsequent owner approached Gesner to complete the house to Gesner's design. The house was named "Ravenseye" by the new owner.

== Design aesthetic ==
Gesner's practice was primarily in custom single-family residences, typically for clients who wanted a striking design that did not conform with prevailing styles. Gesner's designs often used naturally-stained wood and stone, with large glue-laminated support frames on concrete piers. Most had strongly accentuated roofs that dominated the design, framing particular views through large windows. Secondary windows often received stained glass. The houses responded to their sites, but were often detached from the ground, sitting on piers or attached at one end to a steep hillside.

== Notable projects ==
- Eagle's Watch, 1957, rebuilt 1997
- Kimball House, 1957
- Cole House, 1957
- Wave House, 1957
- Condor Crag, 1958
- Hollywood Hills Boathouses, 1959
- Triangle House, 1960
- Stebel House, 1962
- Sandcastle House, 1970
- Flying Wing House, 1970s
- Ravenseye, 1997

== Personal life ==
Gesner's first three marriages ended with divorce. He was the widower of his fourth wife, the actress, Nan Martin. He had three children: Tara Tanzer-Cartwright, Jason Gesner, and Zen Gesner. Gesner was a nephew of the aircraft designer Jack Northrop.

Gesner died from cancer at his home, the Sandcastle, in Malibu on June 10, 2022, at the age of 97.
