= Williams-Cole House =

- U.S. National Register of Historic Places
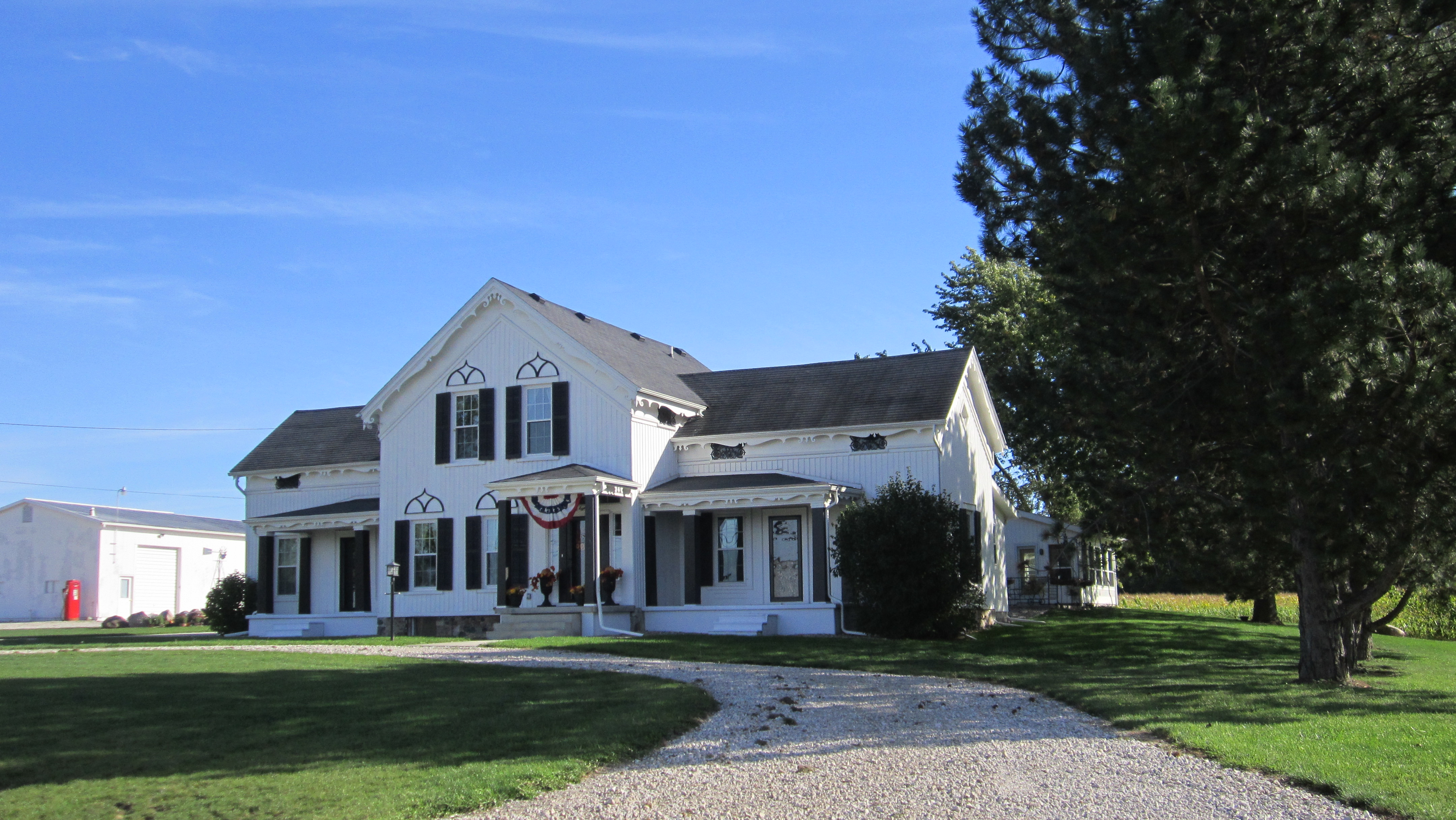
- Interactive map
- Location: 6810 Newburg Rd., Durand, Michigan
- Coordinates: 42°54′35″N 84°01′49″W
- Area: 2.5 acres (1.0 ha)
- Built: 1854
- Architectural style: Greek Revival, Carpenter Gothic
- NRHP reference No.: 86003418
- Added to NRHP: December 4, 1986

The Williams-Cole House is a single family home located at 6810 Newburg Road near Durand, Michigan. It was listed on the National Register of Historic Places in 1986.

== History ==
In 1836, Levi Frost and Daniel Tuttle purchased the land on which this house now stands. Two years later, Benjamin O. Williams (the founder of nearby Owosso) purchased the land from them. Daniel Williams, Benjamin's son, was also involved in developing Owosso, and in 1854 he purchased the farmland from his father. Although records are uncertain, it is quite likely that Daniel Williams built this home on his land as a development project. Williams sold the land and house in 1855.

Over the next two decades, the house changed hands ten times, until 1876 when William N. Cole purchased the property. Cole was born in Brownville, New York, and married Laura Bunce, who had been raised in Michigan. The couple moved to Michigan in 1867, settling near Corunna before purchasing the Williams house with 80 associated acres, and an additional 240 acres nearby. In 1894, the property was transferred to William H. Cole, William N.'s only son. The younger Cole was a Civil War veteran who had previously been both a farmer and a shopkeeper, as well as being elected sheriff of Shiawassee County. He farmed the property until 1908.

The house passed out of the Williams family and went through several owners until being purchased in 1929 by the Chrisinske family, who owned it at least into the 1980s.

== Description ==
The Williams-Cole House, is a two-story, wood-framed gable-roofed structure, covered with board-and-batten siding, with single story, gable-roofed wings attached on both sides and the rear. The house measures 70 feet by 95 feet. The architectural style is an unusual combination of Greek Revival massing and formal structure, and Carpenter Gothic ornamentation. The front facade is three bays wide, with the center bay projecting forward. Windows are six-over-six double hing units, with a symmetrical placement, although the first-floor doorway is set to one side of the central section. The flanking wings are fronted with porches. The door has a traditional Greek Revival enframement. Above each window in the central bay are wood molding tracery caps, giving them the appearance of Gothic arches. At the eaveslines of the main roof and the porches, decorative wood barge-boards add another Gothic element.
