= The Boathouse, Guelph =

Recreational facility in Guelph, Ontario

Coordinates: 43°32′20.5″N 80°14′31″W

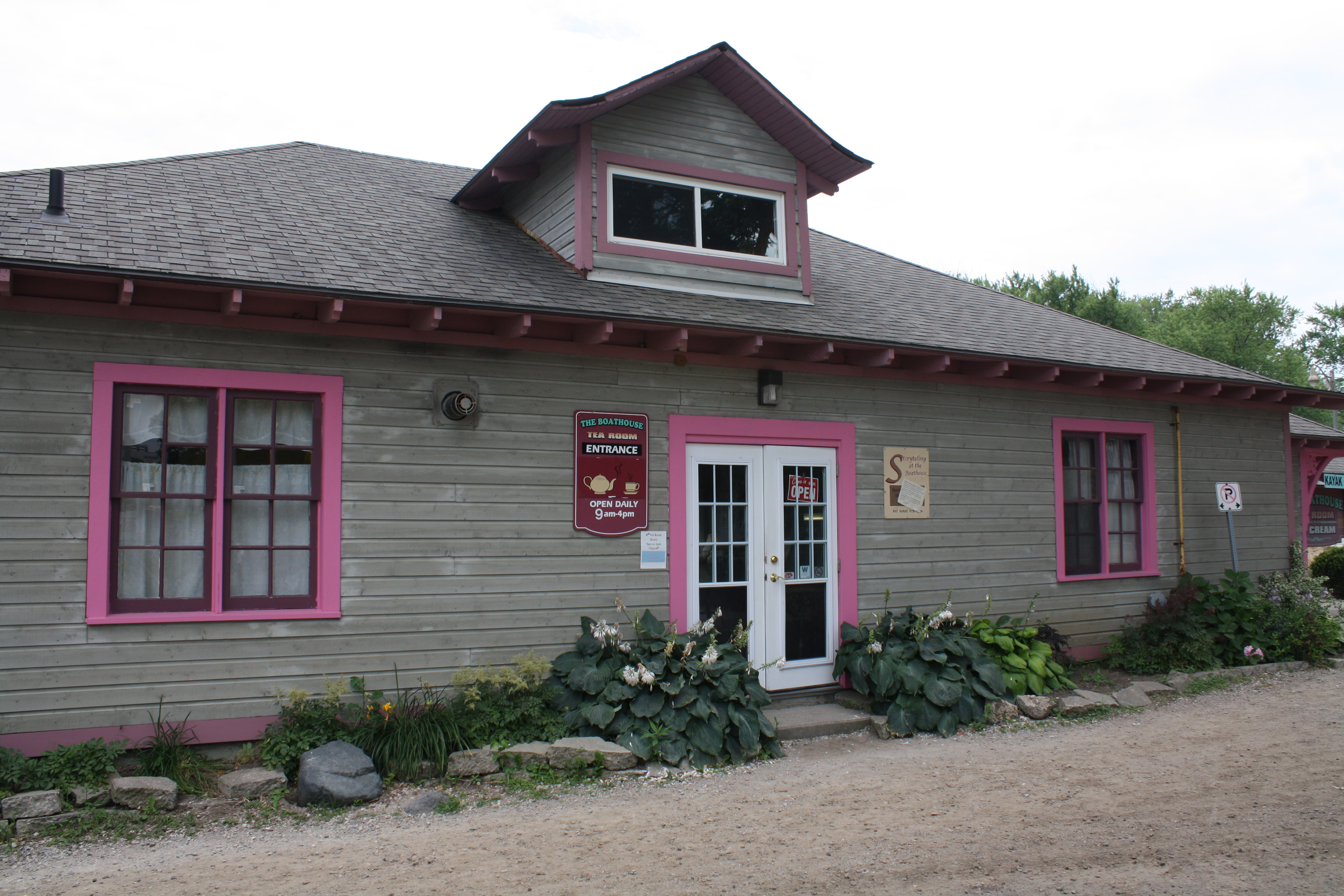
Located downtown, the Boathouse remains a popular historical site in Guelph, Ontario.

The Boathouse, located at 116 Gordon Street in Guelph, Ontario, is a single-story wood frame recreational facility constructed beside Speed River. It was built around 1930 for Edward Johnson, an opera singer from Guelph; the earliest boat house dates back to the 1870s. Mainly used to shelter boats, the Boathouse has also been used as a concession stand, dance hall, and Navy Cadet Headquarters.

== History ==
=== 1800s ===
It is believed that the first boat house was constructed in 1876 by a Mr. O. Coulson. In 1879, Edward McKeague opened a boat rental business operating out of the boat house and, by 1885, William Johnson, the uncle of opera singer, Edward Johnson, took over as manager. The boat house was dependent on the Gow dam forming a pool of water in the river.

In 1895, the Speed Canoe Club was formed and met in a hall every Thursday evening above William Johnson's boat house. The members used to canoe a mile and a half up river to Victoria Park, returning at midnight, locking arms and canoes together, and singing together. Located on Speed River beside the Boathouse, the Speed Canoe Club is considered to be one of Guelph's most active social and sporting organizations, and to this day it continues to be a popular venue for boaters and aquatic enthusiasts alike.

In 1885, management duties shifted to James Johnson's brother William, under whose leadership the Speed Canoe Club was created. During William Johnson's proprietorship of the boat house, the Speed Canoe club was an active social and sporting organization with 250 members between 1895 and 1900.

=== 1900s ===
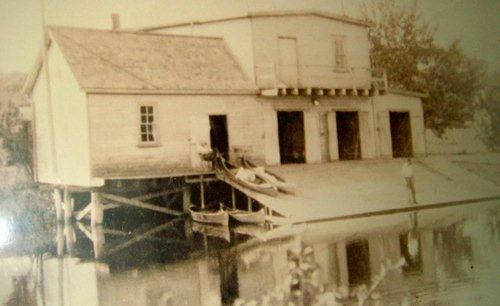
The Boathouse, as taken in 1910

The boat house was used by the Navy League of Canada during World War II, serving as the main headquarters for the Sea Cadets until 1993. At that point, the building had fallen into disrepair. The Sea Cadet unit relocated to new quarters on Cardigan Street, and the city announced its intention to demolish the building and level the land in order to create more parking spots for the Guelph Lawn Bowling Club.

However, some residents argued that the building should be preserved as an historic structure. Restaurateurs made a deal with the city to restore the heritage structure in exchange for a long-term lease at nominal rent. A newer addition at the rear, which had been storage space when the Sea Cadets occupied the building, was demolished, leaving only the 1930s structure.

In 1997, renovations to restore the historic building totaled $100,000, and a 10-year rental agreement with the City of Guelph was reached.

=== 2000s to present ===
In June 2011, the Boathouse celebrated two milestones: 135 years since it was founded and 15 years since its reopening as an ice cream parlor and tea room.

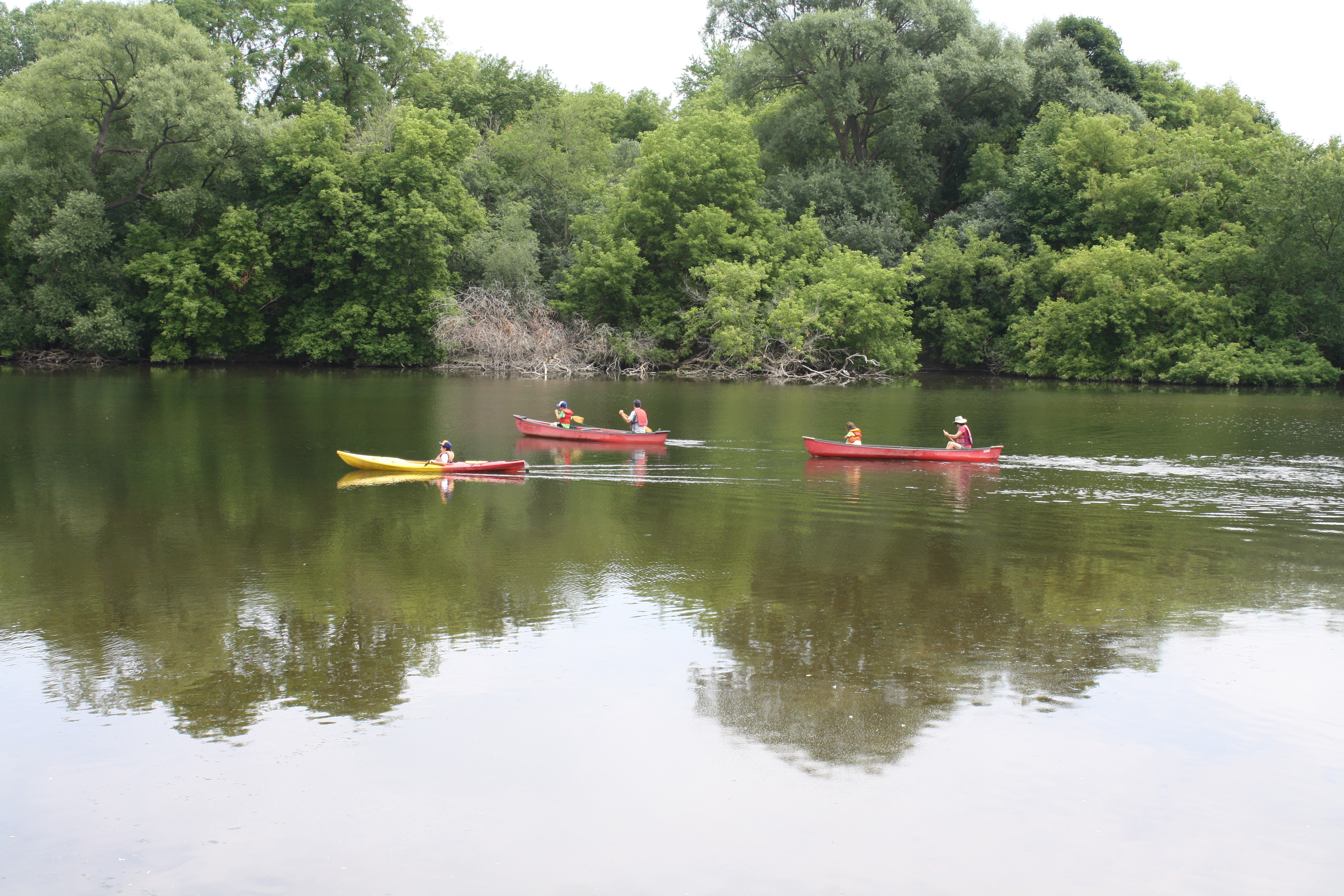
Boaters canoe along the Speed River, located directly beside the Boathouse.
