= E. Merritt Cole House =

Historic house in Massachusetts, United States

- U.S. National Register of Historic Places
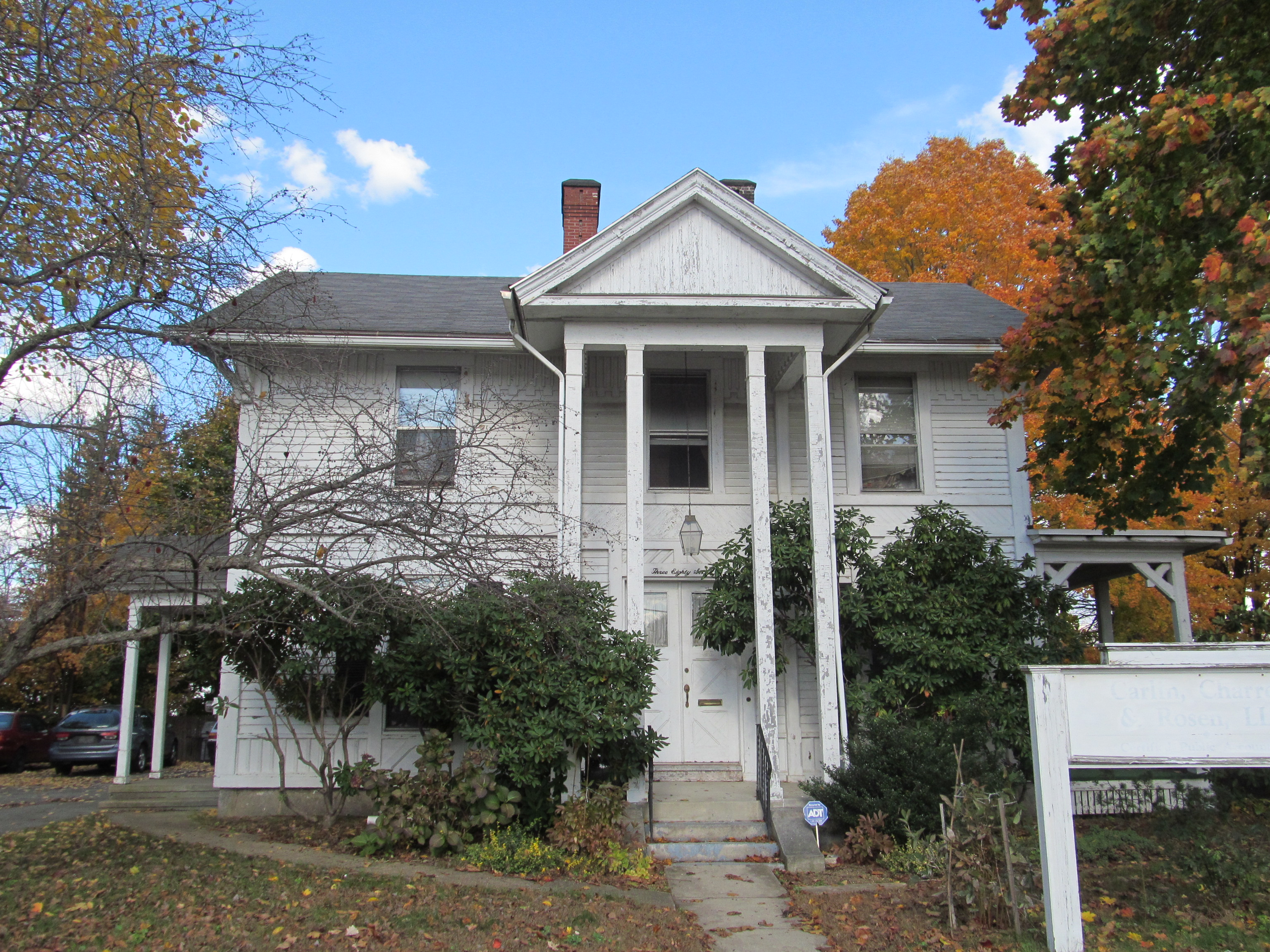
- 386 Main Street

- Location within Massachusetts Location within the United States
- Location: 386 Main St., Southbridge, Massachusetts
- Coordinates: 42°4′36″N 72°2′8″W
- Area: less than one acre
- Built: c. 1855
- Architectural style: Gothic Revival
- MPS: Southbridge MRA
- NRHP reference No.: 89000576
- Added to NRHP: June 22, 1989

The E. Merritt Cole House is a historic house at 386 Main Street in Southbridge, Massachusetts. Built in the early 19th century and restyled sometime between 1855 and 1878, it is a distinctive local example of Gothic Revival architecture. The house was listed on the National Register of Historic Places in 1989.

== Description and history ==
The E. Merritt Cole House is located adjacent to Southbridge's central business district, on an isolated lot that is accessed from the parking lot in front belonging to Consumer Auto Parts as of 2021. It is a 2 1/2-story wood-frame structure, with a gabled roof and clapboarded exterior. Portions of the exterior have the siding applied either vertically or at an angle, and there are panels decorated with diamond motifs. The main facade is three bays wide, and is dominated by a central two-story gabled portico, supported by square posts. A single-story porch extends to the right side, and a secondary entrance on the left side is sheltered by a gabled portico.

The house was built in the early 1800s by Jacob Edwards, and acquired its present Gothic Revival appearance as the result of a renovation between 1855 and 1878. This work was done for E. Merritt Cole, treasurer and a founding shareholder of the American Optical Company, a major local employer. The house's distinctive styling appears to have been an inspiration for similar but more vernacular treatments on worker housing in the area. The house was briefly turned into a law office in the 1990s into the early 2000s.

== See also ==
- National Register of Historic Places listings in Southbridge, Massachusetts
- National Register of Historic Places listings in Worcester County, Massachusetts
