= Boathouses (Hollywood Hills) =

Houses in Los Angeles, California

Coordinates: 34°07′29″N 118°20′52″W

The Boathouses are a group of twelve small houses in the Hollywood Hills of Los Angeles, California. The group is situated on Pacific View Drive and Woodrow Wilson Drive on the south side of Cahuenga Pass. The houses were designed by architect Harry Gesner and built in 1959 by Norwegian boatbuilders using tools such as axes and adzes.

== Arrangement ==
The sites for the houses were small lots on steep hillsides with views of a small canyon above the San Fernando Valley, only 25 feet (7.6 m) to 35 feet (11 m) wide, and 95 feet (29 m) long. Developer Ronald Buck asked Gesner to work with the unusually narrow, steep lots, which had been subdivided in 1911 and had lain vacant ever since. Gesner chose to design and build the houses like boats, going to the extreme of bringing in boatbuilders with tools more suited to boats than houses, leading to their unique appearance.

The uphill sides of the houses face the street with a one-story elevation fronted by a carport that serves as the main entrance. The downhill faces are two stories high, supported on piers. The downhill sides are entirely glazed to take advantage of the views. The houses have prominent roofs with deep eaves, and few windows on the sides, which closely adjoin the other houses in the group. The interiors are arranged with an upper level with kitchen, living room and deck, a bathroom on an intermediate level, and a bedroom on the lower level, with 945 square feet (87.8 m^{2}) of space. Later versions added a second bedroom against the hillside. These later houses had 1,200 square feet (110 m^{2}) of living space.
