= National Register of Historic Places listings in Moniteau County, Missouri =

Location of Moniteau County in Missouri

This is a list of the National Register of Historic Places listings in Moniteau County, Missouri.

This is intended to be a complete list of the properties and districts on the National Register of Historic Places in Moniteau County, Missouri, United States. Latitude and longitude coordinates are provided for many National Register properties and districts; these locations may be seen together in a map.

There are 11 properties and districts listed on the National Register in the county.

This National Park Service list is complete through NPS recent listings posted August 28, 2026.

== Current listings ==
	Name on the Register	Image	Date listed	Location	City or town	Description
1	Assumption of the Blessed Virgin Mary Parish Historic District	Assumption of the Blessed Virgin Mary Parish Historic District	February 5, 2014 (#13001147)	NW. corner of jct. of Cedron Rd. & Zey Ln. 38°46′25″N 92°34′05″W	Jamestown	
2	Louis Bruce Farmstead Historic District		January 7, 1992 (#91001916)	Route V north of its junction with Route A, at Rock Enon Creek; 38°27′53″N 92°31′07″W	Russellville	
3	Finke Opera House	Finke Opera House	March 22, 2004 (#04000214)	312 N. High St. 38°38′07″N 92°33′55″W	California	
4	Geiger Archeological Site		July 29, 1969 (#69000114)	Address Restricted	Sandy Hook	
5	Gray-Wood Buildings	Gray-Wood Buildings	January 19, 1984 (#84002594)	401-407 N. High St. 38°38′15″N 92°33′55″W	California	
6	Harrison School		February 1, 2021 (#100006080)	235 East Howard St. 38°39′30″N 92°46′31″W	Tipton	
7	High Point Historic District	High Point Historic District	January 26, 2005 (#04001561)	61235-61243 Route C 38°29′04″N 92°35′24″W	High Point	
8	Maclay Mansion		February 26, 1979 (#79001383)	209 W. Howard St. 38°39′35″N 92°46′54″W	Tipton	
9	Moniteau County Courthouse Square	Moniteau County Courthouse Square	October 15, 1970 (#70000341)	Public Sq. 38°38′11″N 92°33′53″W	California	
10	Old Barnhill Building		April 12, 1982 (#82003151)	301 N. High St. 38°38′05″N 92°33′56″W	California	
11	Old California City Hall and Fire Station		April 12, 1982 (#82003152)	101 N. High St. 38°37′58″N 92°33′55″W	California	

== See also ==
- List of National Historic Landmarks in Missouri
- National Register of Historic Places listings in Missouri
