= Courthouse Square Historic District =

Courthouse Square Historic District may refer to:

== In the United States ==
(by state then city)

- Athens Courthouse Square Commercial Historic District, Athens, Alabama
- Greene County Courthouse Square District, Eutaw, Alabama
- Grove Hill Courthouse Square Historic District, Grove Hill, Alabama
- Chambers County Courthouse Square Historic District, LaFayette, Alabama
- Marion Courthouse Square Historic District, in Marion, Alabama
- Moulton Courthouse Square Historic District, Moulton, Alabama
- Talladega Courthouse Square Historic District, Talladega, Alabama, NRHP-listed in Talladega County
- Colbert County Courthouse Square Historic District, Tuscumbia, Alabama
- Harrison Courthouse Square Historic District, Harrison, Arkansas
- Ozark Courthouse Square Historic District (Ozark, Arkansas)
- Ozark Courthouse Square Historic District (Ozark, Missouri)
- Carrollton Courthouse Square Historic District, Carrollton, Illinois
- Carthage Courthouse Square Historic District (Carthage, Illinois)
- Lincoln Courthouse Square Historic District, Lincoln, Illinois
- Taylorville Courthouse Square Historic District, Taylorville, Illinois
- Albion Courthouse Square Historic District, Albion, Indiana
- Bedford Courthouse Square Historic District, Bedford, Indiana
- Courthouse Square Historic District (Bloomington, Indiana)
- Crown Point Courthouse Square Historic District, Crown Point, Indiana
- Johnson County Courthouse Square, Franklin, Indiana
- Courthouse Square Historic District (Greencastle, Indiana)
- Greenfield Courthouse Square Historic District, Greenfield, Indiana
- Hartford City Courthouse Square Historic District, Hartford City, Indiana
- Huntington Courthouse Square Historic District, Huntington, Indiana
- Liberty Courthouse Square Historic District, Liberty, Indiana
- Posey County Courthouse Square, Mount Vernon, Indiana
- Hamilton County Courthouse Square, Noblesville, Indiana
- Scottsburg Courthouse Square Historic District, Scottsburg, Indiana
- Warsaw Courthouse Square Historic District, Warsaw, Indiana
- Winchester Courthouse Square Historic District, Winchester, Indiana
- Courthouse Square Historic District (Centerville, Iowa)
- Harlan Courthouse Square Commercial District, Harlan, IA
- Winterset Courthouse Square Commercial Historic District, Winterset, Iowa
- Hiawatha Courthouse Square Historic District, Hiawatha, KS, listed on the NRHP in Kansas
- Doniphan County Courthouse Square Historic District, Troy, Kansas
- Yates Center Courthouse Square Historic District, Yates Center, Kansas
- Elizabethtown Courthouse Square and Commercial District, Elizabethtown, Kentucky
- Courthouse Square and Mechanics' Row Historic District, Maysville, Kentucky
- Owingsville Commercial District and Courthouse Square, Owingsville, Kentucky
- Paris Courthouse Square Historic District, Paris, Kentucky
- Pineville Courthouse Square Historic District, Pineville, Kentucky
- South Courthouse Square Historic District, Somerset, Kentucky, NRHP-listed in Pulaski County
- Old Courthouse Square (Lake Providence, Louisiana)
- Courthouse Square Historic District (Mason, Michigan)
- Canton Courthouse Square Historic District, Canton, MS, listed on the NRHP in Mississippi
- Hernando Courthouse Square District, Hernando, Mississippi, listed on the NRHP in Mississippi
- Holly Springs Courthouse Square Historic District, Holly Springs, Mississippi, listed on the NRHP in Mississippi
- Oxford Courthouse Square Historic District, Oxford, Mississippi
- Moniteau County Courthouse Square, California, Missouri
- Carthage Courthouse Square Historic District (Carthage, Missouri)
- Courthouse Square Historic District (Chillicothe, Missouri)
- Courthouse Square Historic District (Farmington, Missouri)
- Fayette Courthouse Square Historic District, Fayette, Missouri
- Harrisonville Courthouse Square Historic District, Harrisonville, Missouri
- South Liberty Courthouse Square Historic District, Liberty, Missouri
- West Liberty Courthouse Square Historic District, Liberty, Missouri
- Courthouse Square Historic District (West Plains, Missouri)
- Seward County Courthouse Square Historic District, Seward, NE, listed on the NRHP in Nebraska
- Orleans County Courthouse Historic District, Albion, New York
- Delaware County Courthouse Square District, Delhi, New York
- Northampton County Courthouse Square, Jackson, North Carolina
- Chardon Courthouse Square District, Chardon, Ohio
- Kenton Courthouse Square Historic District, Kenton, Ohio, listed on the NRHP in Ohio
- Sidney Courthouse Square Historic District, Sidney, Ohio, NRHP-listed in Shelby County
- New Cordell Courthouse Square Historic District, New Cordell, Oklahoma
- Perry Courthouse Square Historic District, Perry, Oklahoma
- Courthouse Square (Dayton, Oregon)
- Charlotte Courthouse Square Historic District, Charlotte, Tennessee, listed on the NRHP in Tennessee
- Dyersburg Courthouse Square Historic District, Dyersburg, Tennessee, listed on the NRHP in Tennessee
- Pulaski Courthouse Square Historic District, Pulaski, Tennessee, listed on the NRHP in Tennessee
- Shelbyville Courthouse Square Historic District, Shelbyville, Tennessee
- Shelby County Courthouse Square, Center, TX, listed on the NRHP in Texas
- Denton County Courthouse Square Historic District, Denton, Texas, NRHP-listed in Denton County
- Trinity County Courthouse Square, Groveton, Texas, listed on the NRHP in Texas
- Fayette County Courthouse Square Historic District, La Grange, Texas
- Chesterfield County Courthouse and Courthouse Square, Chesterfield, Virginia
- Gloucester County Courthouse Square Historic District, Gloucester, Virginia
- Brunswick County Courthouse Square, Lawrenceville, Virginia
- Mathews County Courthouse Square, Mathews, Virginia
- Beckley Courthouse Square Historic District, Beckley, West Virginia
- Courthouse Square Historic District (Lancaster, Wisconsin), listed on the NRHP in Wisconsin
