= Court Square (disambiguation) =

Court Square is a park in Springfield, Massachusetts.

Court Square may also refer to:

- One Court Square, a building in New York City
- Court Square–23rd Street station, a subway station in New York City
- Court Square Fountain, a monument in Montgomery, Alabama
- Goochland County Court Square, a district in Goochland County, Virginia

== See also ==
- Courthouse Square (disambiguation)
- Courthouse Square Historic District (disambiguation)
- Court Square Historic District (disambiguation)
