= Courthouse Square (disambiguation) =

Courthouse Square or Old Courthouse Square is an American term that usually refers to a square in the middle of a town, in which a courthouse, usually county courthouse, is located.

It may also refer to:

- Courthouse Square, a movie production set at Universal Studios in Los Angeles, California
- Courthouse Square Park, listed on the NRHP in Oregon
- Old Courthouse Square (Lake Providence, Louisiana), listed on the NRHP in Louisiana
- Court House Square (Charleston)
- Court House Square (IRT Flushing Line), a New York City Subway station, listed on the NRHP in New York

== See also ==
- Courthouse Square Historic District (disambiguation)
- Court Square (disambiguation)
- Court Square Historic District (disambiguation)
- Pioneer Courthouse Square
