= High Point, Missouri =

Unincorporated community in Missouri, United States

Coordinates: 38°29′04″N 92°35′27″W

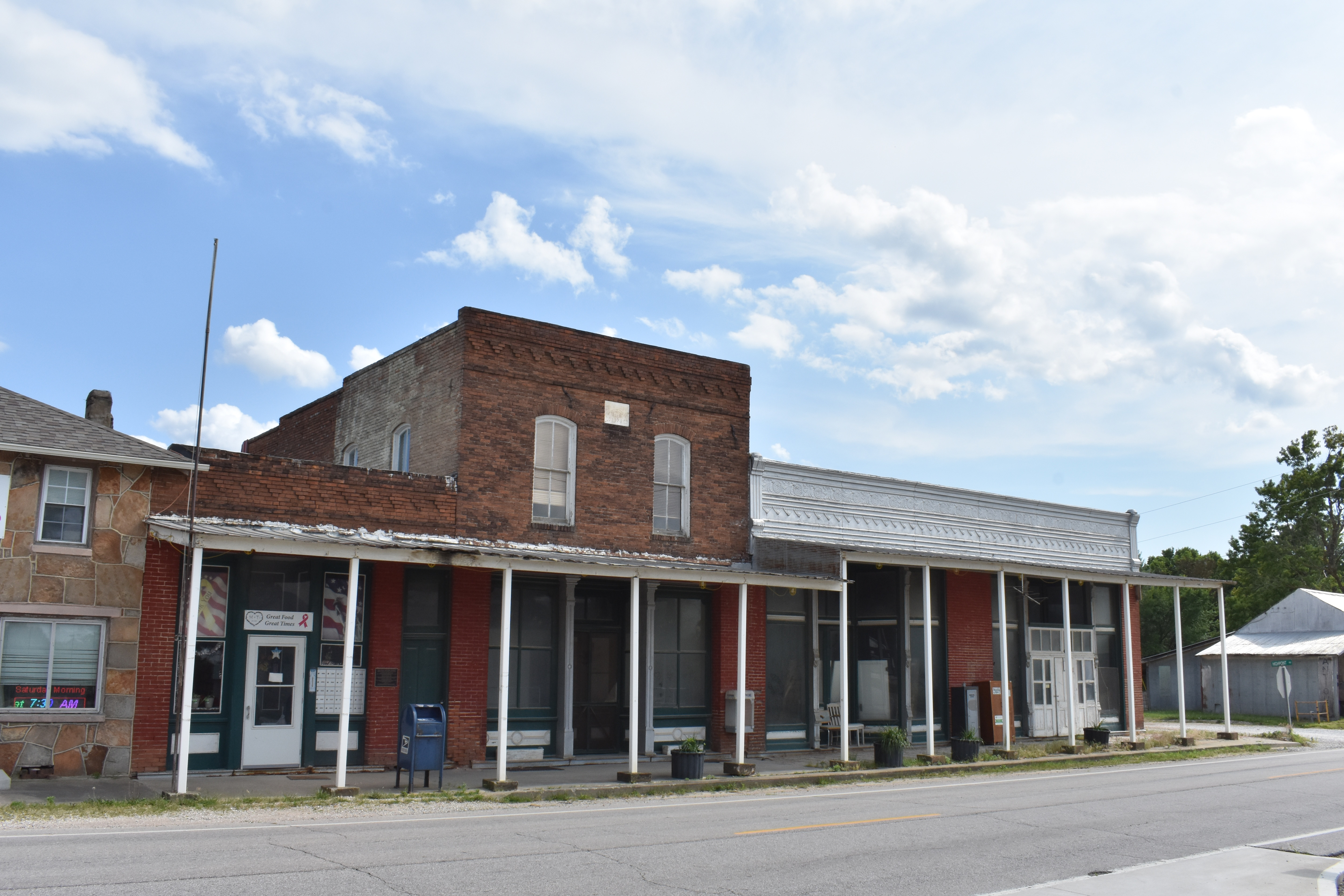
High Point, Missouri. June 2026

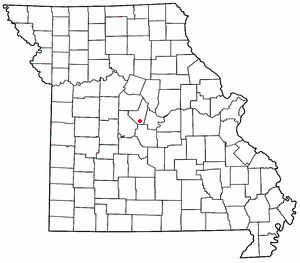

High Point is an unincorporated community in southern Moniteau County, Missouri, United States. It is located ten miles south of California, approximately one mile west of Route 87 on Missouri Route C.

== History ==
The first settlement at High Point was made in the 1830s. A post office called High Point was established in 1852, and remained in operation until 1973. The community was so named on account of its lofty elevation.

The High Point Historic District was listed on the National Register of Historic Places in 2005.

== Notable people ==
- Louis F. Hart, seventh lieutenant governor, and ninth governor, of the state of Washington.
- Jack Tising, professional baseball player.

== Education ==
The one and only school located in the High Point R-III School District is High Point School, which serves grades K-8, Home of the Blue Jays. The school is Accredited With Distinction by the Missouri Department of Elementary and Secondary Education.

After 8th grade, students attend either California High School, Eldon High School, or Russellville High School.
