= Burgers' Smokehouse =

Food producer in California, Missouri

Burgers’ Smokehouse is a smokehouse and producer of cured and smoked meats and other foods in California, Missouri. It is one of the largest processors of naturally cured hams in the U.S. The company's packaging says "Home of Hickory Smoked, Sugar Cured Meats since 1927". However, the family's selling of hams by E.M. Burger and his German mother Hulda is said to go back to the 1920s. The company sells hams, bacon, sausage, and over a dozen other specialty meats".

== Operations ==
The award-winning supplier sells through grocery stores, restaurants, and direct mail and over the internet. Its facility is located 3 miles south of California, Missouri on State Highway 87, along with the retail store on the premises of the factory. In 2020, the retail store was closed after 95 years in operation. Sales from the store accounted for less than one percent of total business.

== Trivia ==
The 122-unit casual burger chain Hard Rock Cafe began offering items from Burgers' in 2007. The company has sent care packages to U.S. troops in Iraq.
