= Louis Bruce Farmstead Historic District =

Historic district in Missouri, United States

- U.S. National Register of Historic Places
- U.S. Historic district
- Location within Missouri Location within the United States
- Location: Route V north of its junction with Route A, at Rock Enon Creek, near Russellville, Missouri
- Coordinates: 38°27′53″N 92°31′07″W
- Area: 10.7 acres (4.3 ha)
- Built: 1870
- Architectural style: Georgian Plan I-House
- NRHP reference No.: 91001916
- Added to NRHP: January 7, 1992

Louis Bruce Farmstead Historic District, also known as Rock Enon Farm, is a historic home and farm and national historic district located near Russellville, Moniteau County, Missouri. The district encompasses six contributing buildings and one contributing structure associated with a late-19th century farmstead. They are the house (1872-1876), a smokehouse / multipurpose building (c.1870-76), a privy (c. 1870-1876), a spring house (1873), a granary (c. 1870-1876), a substantial barn (1870), and a stone retaining wall with a swinging iron gate and carriage steps. The house is a 2 1/2-story, five-bay, central hall I-house constructed of limestone blocks. It has a gable roof and a three-bay front porch.

It was listed on the National Register of Historic Places in 1992.
