= Courthouse Square Historic District (Chillicothe, Missouri) =

Historic district in Missouri, United States

- U.S. National Register of Historic Places
- U.S. Historic district
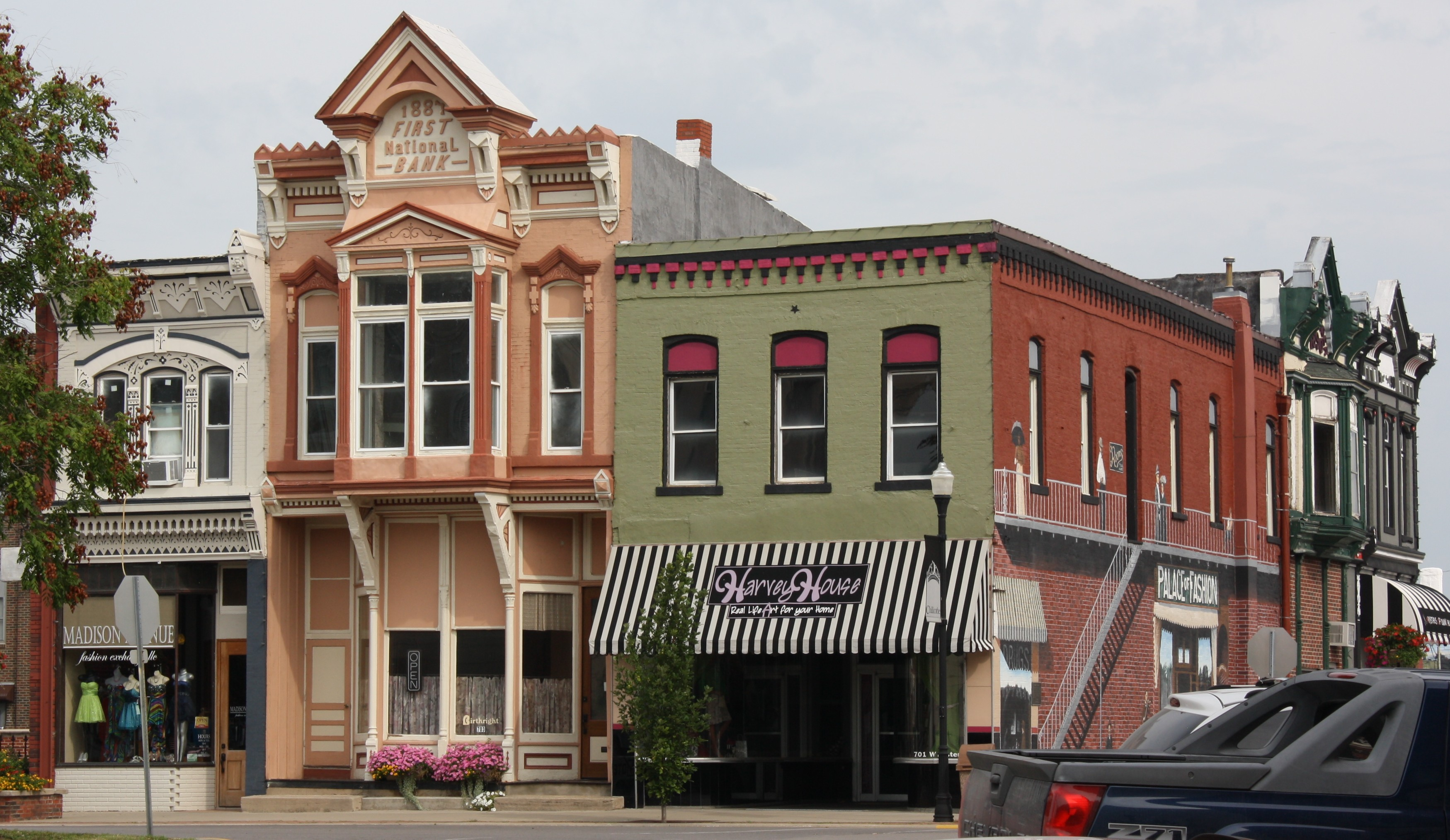
- NW corner Webster & Elm, September 2014

- Location within Missouri Location within the United States
- Location: Roughly bounded by Calhoun, Jackson, Washington, and Elm Sts., Chillicothe, Missouri
- Coordinates: 39°47′39″N 93°33′09″W
- Area: 8.5 acres (3.4 ha)
- Built: 1877
- Architect: Roberts, Warren; Schultz, S.E.
- Architectural style: Late Victorian, Commercial Block, Beaux-Arts
- MPS: Chillicothe, Missouri MPS
- NRHP reference No.: 02001177
- Added to NRHP: October 16, 2002

Courthouse Square Historic District is a national historic district located at Chillicothe, Livingston County, Missouri. The district encompasses 24 contributing buildings in the central business district and surrounding residential area of Chillicothe. It developed between about 1877 and 1950, and includes representative examples of Late Victorian and Beaux Arts style architecture. Notable buildings include the Livingston County Courthouse (1914), Wallbrunn Building (c. 1898), First National Bank Building #2 (1906), Peoples Trust Building (c. 1916), Nick J. Rensch Building (c. 1877), Davis/Milbank Building (c. 1880), Leeper Hotel (1884, c. 1915, 1929), Chillicothe City Hall (1926), First National Bank Building #1 (1887), and Sipple Clothing Co/Broyles Land Co Building (c. 1889).

It was listed on the National Register of Historic Places in 2002.
