= Moulton Courthouse Square Historic District =

Historic district in Alabama, United States

- U.S. National Register of Historic Places
- U.S. Historic district
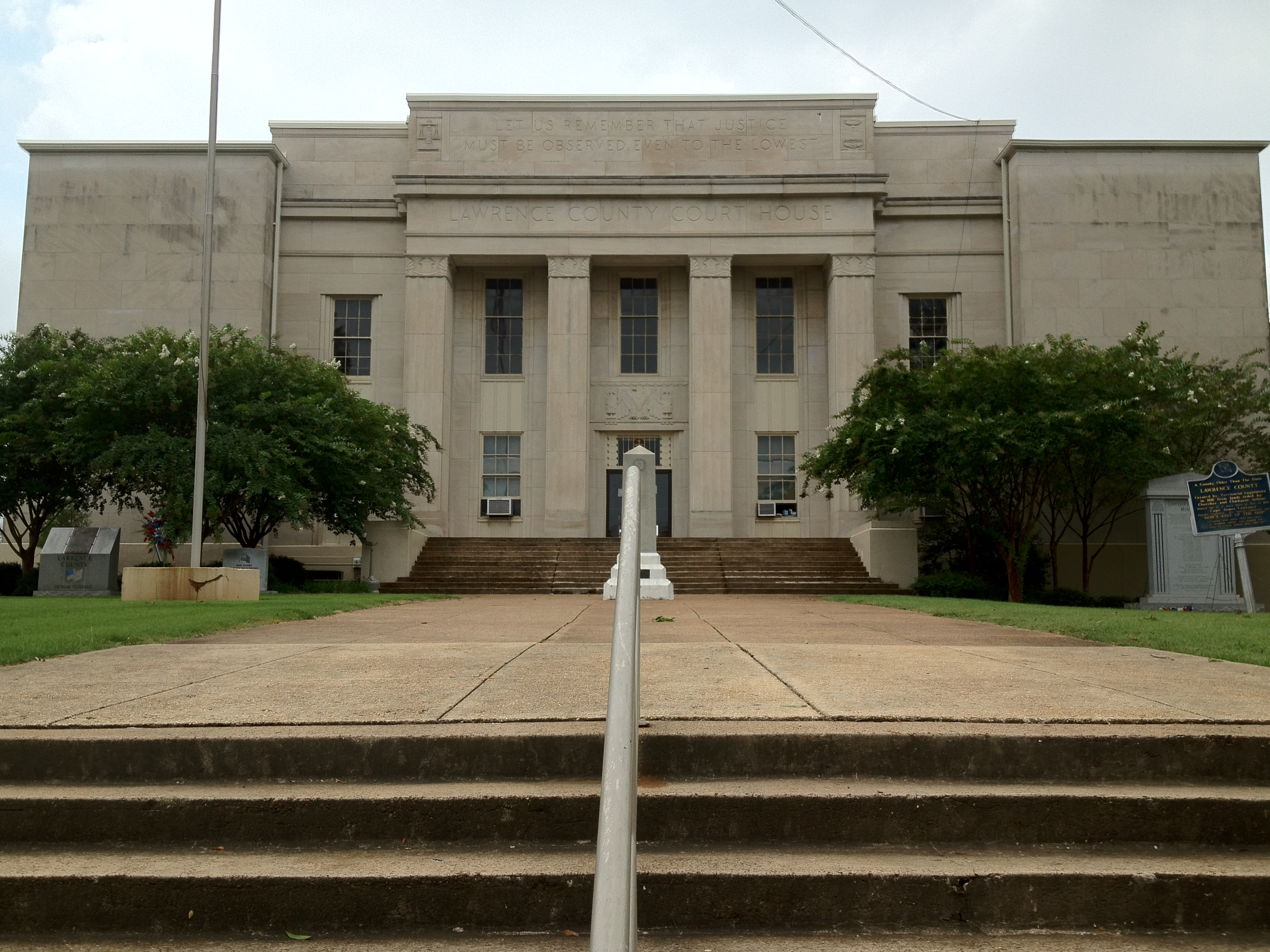
- The Lawrence County Courthouse in September 2012

- Location within Alabama Location within the United States
- Location: Roughly bounded by Lawrence, Main, Court, and Market Sts., Moulton, Alabama
- Coordinates: 34°28′52″N 87°17′30″W
- Area: 9 acres (3.6 ha)
- Built by: W.R. Jackson
- Architect: Albert R. Frahn
- NRHP reference No.: 98001026
- Added to NRHP: August 14, 1998

The Moulton Courthouse Square Historic District is a historic district in Moulton, Alabama. Moulton's development began in 1820, when it was chosen as the county seat of the newly formed Lawrence County. The first courthouse was a log structure; a log jail on the west side of the square operated until 1911, when it was replaced with the current, 3-story brick jail and courthouse annex. Due to its lack of rail and river connections, development around the square remained sparse. The log courthouse was replaced in 1860 with a two-story, square building with Classical Revival details. The cotton economy of Lawrence County rebounded after the Civil War with the construction of several cotton gins, though nearly all of the structures built along the square in the late 19th century were later razed and replaced. The oldest extant buildings in the district were built in 1911: the three-story courthouse annex, and the two-story, stone faced Citizens' Bank building. The northern part of Market Street, on the west side of the square, were constructed during the early 1920s. Lawrence County's economy received a boost from New Deal programs, most notably the Tennessee Valley Authority's fertilizer program and construction of Wheeler Dam. Most of the square's buildings were constructed during the late 1930s and 1940s, in contrast to most historic downtowns around the South. The current courthouse was completed in 1936. The district was listed on the National Register of Historic Places in 1998.
