= Finke Opera House =

- U.S. National Register of Historic Places
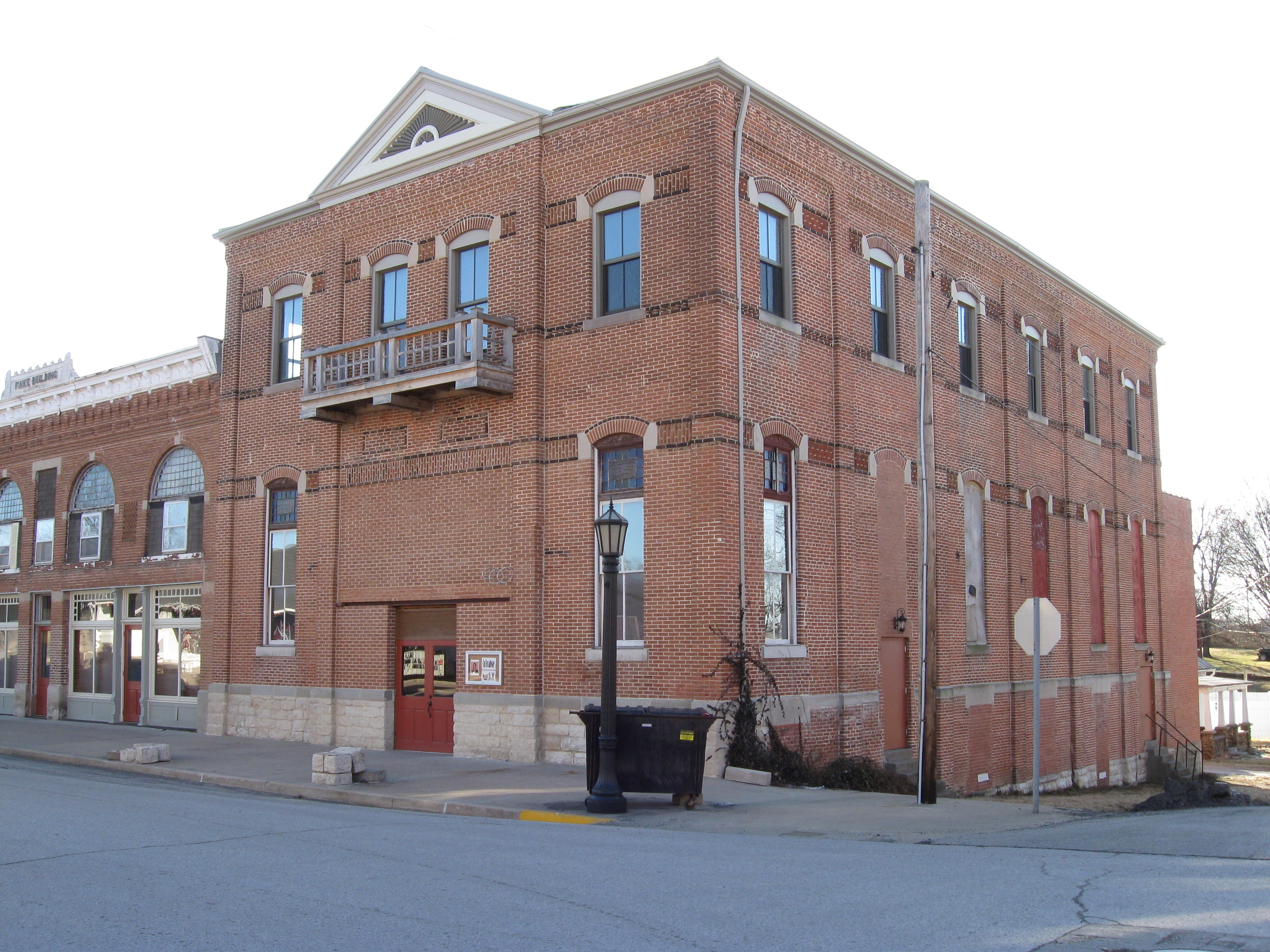
- Finke Opera House, February 2010

- Location within Missouri Location within the United States
- Location: 312 N. High St., California, Missouri
- Coordinates: 38°38′7″N 92°33′55″W
- Area: less than one acre
- Built: 1885
- Architect: Legg, Jerome Bibb; Steigmeyer, O.W.
- Architectural style: Late Victorian
- NRHP reference No.: 04000214
- Added to NRHP: March 22, 2004

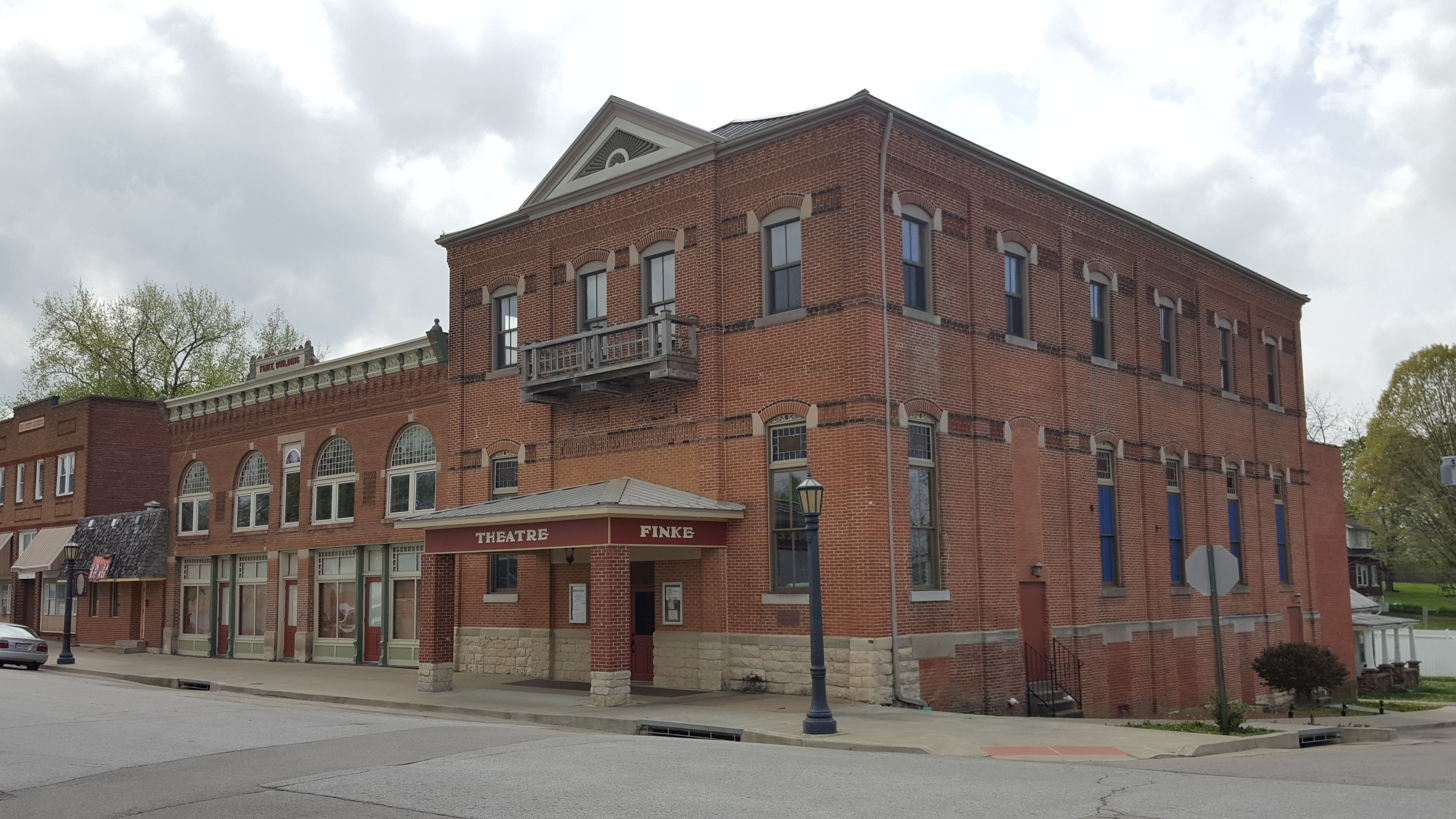
Finke Opera House in April 2017

Finke Opera House, also known as the Ritz Theatre, is a historic opera house located at California, Moniteau County, Missouri. It was built in 1885, and is a two-story, eclectic Late Victorian style brick building. The building features decorative brickwork banding and segmental window arches with stone accents. It was built as a multi-use facility and now used as a community theater / meeting hall.

It was added to the National Register of Historic Places in 2004.
