= Court Square Historic District =

Court Square Historic District may refer to:

- Court Square–Dexter Avenue Historic District, listed on the NRHP in Alabama
- Court Square Historic District (Leitchfield, Kentucky), National Register of Historic Places listings in Grayson County, Kentucky
- Court Square Historic District (Springfield, Massachusetts), listed on the NRHP in Massachusetts
- Court Square Historic District (Memphis, Tennessee), National Register of Historic Places listings in Shelby County, Tennessee
