= Court Square Fountain =

Fountain in Montgomery, Alabama, US

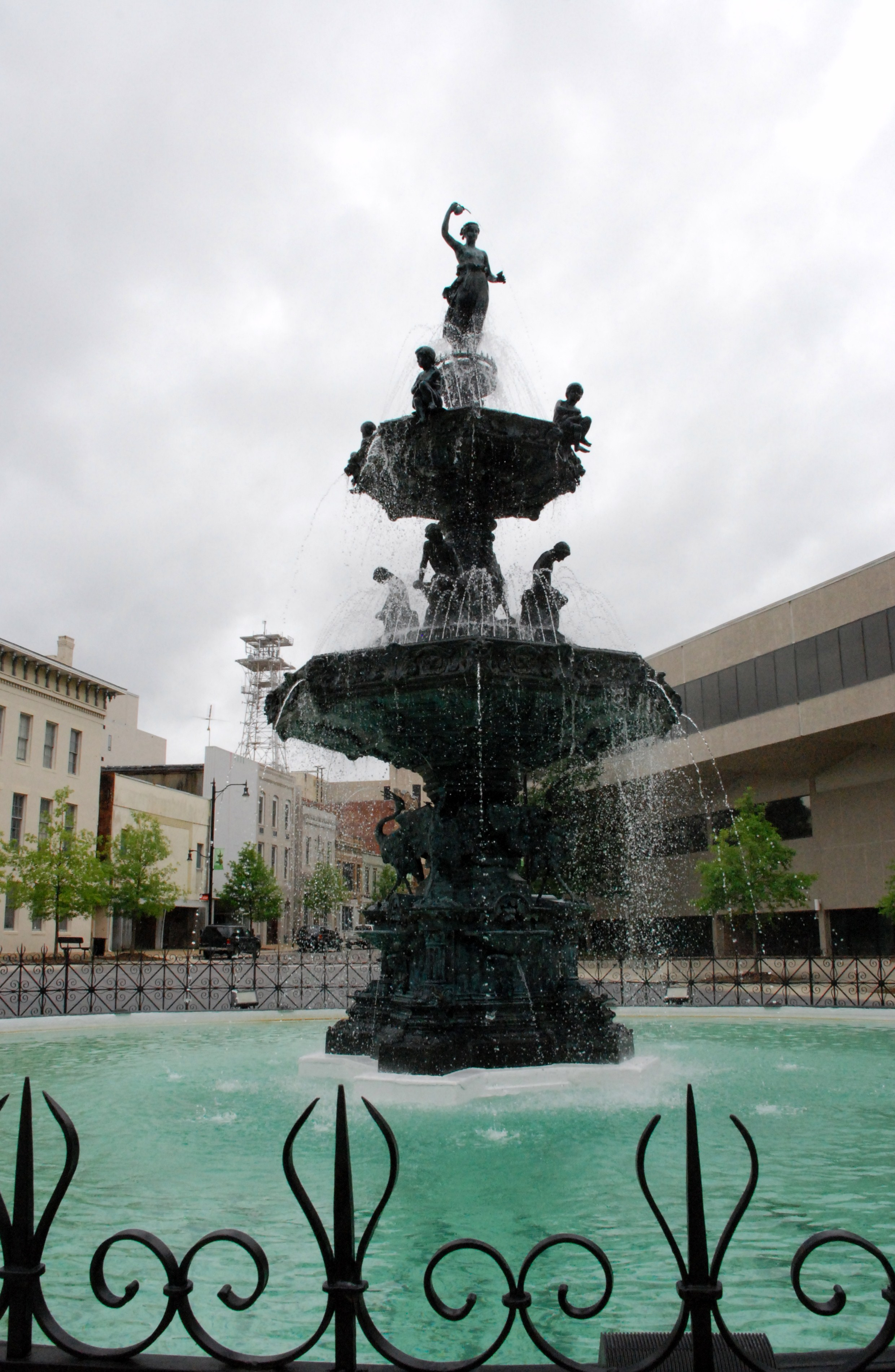
- Year: 1885
- Medium: Cast iron
- Dimensions: (25 feet in)
- Location: Montgomery, Alabama; 32°22′38″N 86°18′33″W

The Court Square Fountain, in the Court Square-Dexter Avenue Historic District of Montgomery, Alabama, was established in 1885 on top of an artesian well, which native Alabamians used long before the area was settled. The fountain contains statues based on Greek mythology. The surrounding area, once the location for Montgomery's bustling slave trade, has seen most of its historical buildings torn down; the fountain's statues were replaced with aluminum ones in the 1980s.

== Location, history ==
The fountain was built on top of an artesian well, a watering hole already for the native Alabamians long before the coming of European settlers. By June 1853 the well was 475 feet deep and flowed at two gallons per minute. The location is also the place where two communities, Alabama Town and New Philadelphia, had grown together to form what would be called Montgomery. Later, the area was the central location of the Montgomery slave trade. A ten-foot deep basin with a pipe leading down was in place by 1885 when the city council voted to appropriate $4,900 to improve the basin.

== Description ==
The fountain was long believed to have been the work of Frederick MacMonnies; the director of the Alabama Archives and History in 1935 asked him if it was his design, and he denied.

On top of the fountain is a statue of Hebe, the Greek goddess of eternal youth. The fountain itself is made of cast iron. The statues came from a catalog of zinc iron statues: on top, a "Canova's Hebe", one layer down four "Seated Boys" holding towels, one layer down four "Narcissus" figures, and at the bottom a "Stem Bitterns", "a group of three free-standing birds around the base stem of a cast-iron fountain". All these statues were replaced in 1984 by aluminum versions; those, however, were corroded by chlorine in the water only twenty years later.

The historical buildings around the fountain, which was known as the "romantic center" of the city, have mostly been demolished, one entire block of them in the 1960s to make way for a Pizitz department store, which opened in 1972. Across from the fountain on Court Square is the Winter Building, whence the telegram giving the order to fire on Fort Sumter was given. Also across from the fountain, is the bus stop that Rosa Parks famously refused to give up her seat thus starting the Montgomery Bus Boycott, a crucial part in the early Civil Right Movement. Rosa Parks refused her seat not at Court Sq. but further up the street where the Empire Theater was. Section 486 of the Montgomery City Ordinance (1888 version) forbids the interfering with fish and fowl in the basin of the statue, or the disposing of liquids or solids in it; violators could be fined $100.

The sculpture of Hebe at the top of the fountain was likely modeled on a sculpture by Antonio Canova. Nearly identical fountains can be found at Fountain Square in Bowling Green, Kentucky, and Court Square in Memphis, Tennessee, all cast by J.L. Mott Ironworks of New York.

== In art ==
Montgomery-born painter Anne Goldthwaite depicted the fountain with a cotton wagon running along in front of it in her painting Bringing Cotton Bails to Market. Zelda Fitzgerald played here as a child, and poet Andrew Hudgins located one of the poems in A Clown at Midnight (2013) at the fountain.

== See also ==
- Slave markets and slave jails in the United States
