= Shelbyville Courthouse Square Historic District =

Historic district in Tennessee, United States

- U.S. National Register of Historic Places
- U.S. Historic district
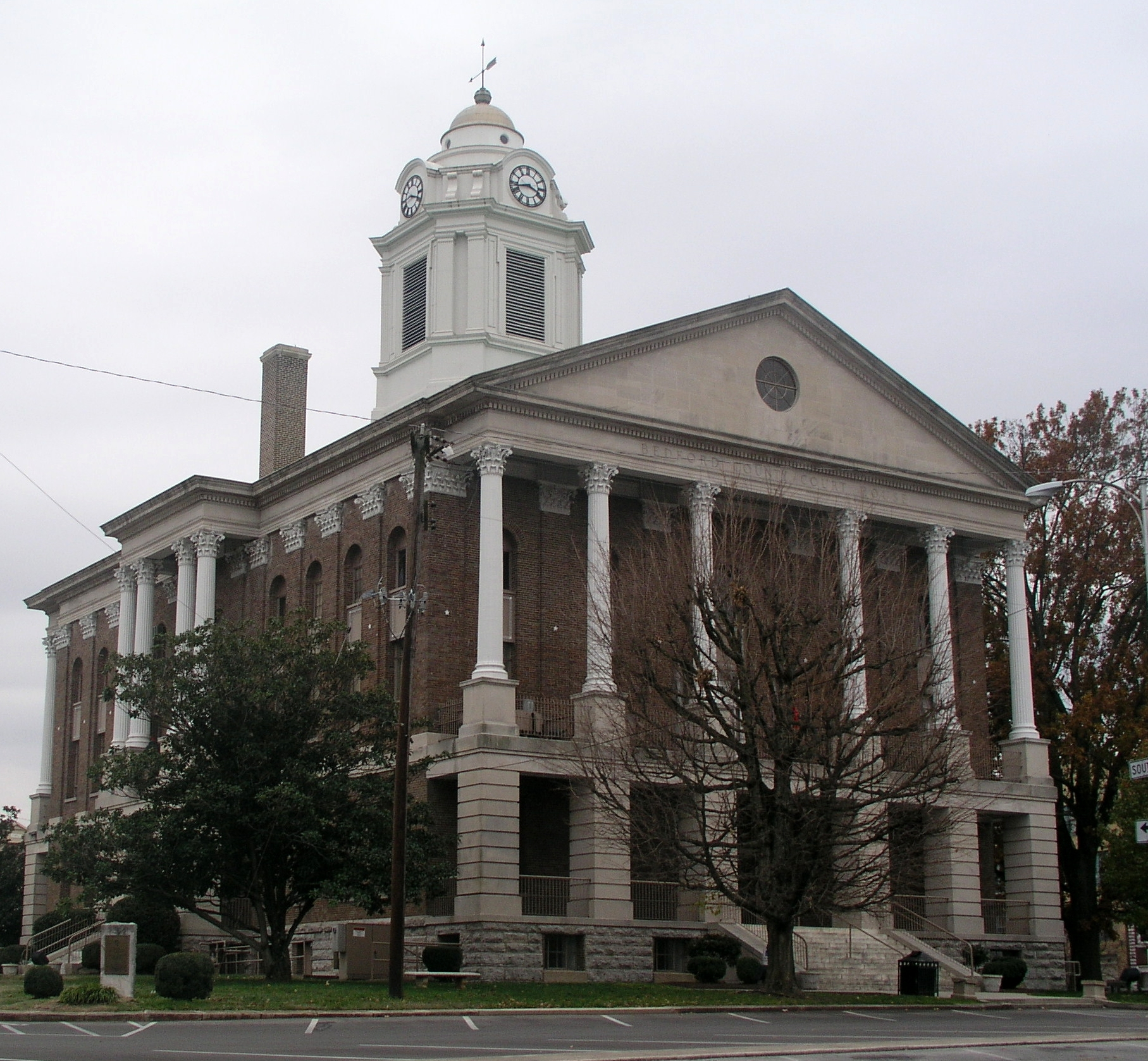
- Bedford County Courthouse in Shelbyville

- Location within Tennessee Location within the United States
- Location: Public Square (Main, Spring, Depot, and Holland Sts.), Shelbyville, Tennessee
- Area: 9 acres (3.6 ha)
- Architectural style: Late Victorian
- NRHP reference No.: 82001725
- Added to NRHP: October 27, 1982

The Shelbyville Courthouse Square Historic District is a historic district in Shelbyville, Tennessee, centered on the Bedford County Courthouse Square.

The courthouse square was laid out in 1810 as a central block, bounded by four streets and surrounded by a grid of square city blocks of the same size. Merchants and tradesmen located their businesses on the blocks surrounding the courthouse square. Lots with street frontage facing the courthouse initially sold for prices 40 times higher than land near the edge of the town grid. This design, known as the "Shelbyville square" or "Shelbyville plan", was the prototype for numerous other public squares created throughout the 19th century in towns in southern Middle Tennessee, other parts of the southeastern United States, the American Midwest, and Texas.

Five different Bedford County courthouse buildings have stood on the courthouse square. The first courthouse was completed in 1810. A new structure replaced it in 1813. That second courthouse was destroyed by a tornado on May 31, 1830. The third courthouse building was completed in 1833 and stood until 1863, when it was burned down (apparently accidentally) by Confederate Army forces occupying Shelbyville. It was replaced in 1873 by the county's fourth courthouse. In 1934, a lynch mob burned down the fourth courthouse after learning that the young African-American man they wanted to hang had been taken from the county jail and transported to another county for his protection. The current courthouse building is Bedford County's fifth courthouse. It is a Classical Revival building designed in 1935 by the Nashville architectural firm of Marr and Holman.

Italianate and Romanesque architectural styles predominate among the historic commercial buildings facing the streets around the square. The Gunter Building, built in 1927 on the west side of the square, is designed in the Art Deco style.

The historic district was placed on the National Register of Historic Places in 1982.
