= Gray-Wood Buildings =

- U.S. National Register of Historic Places
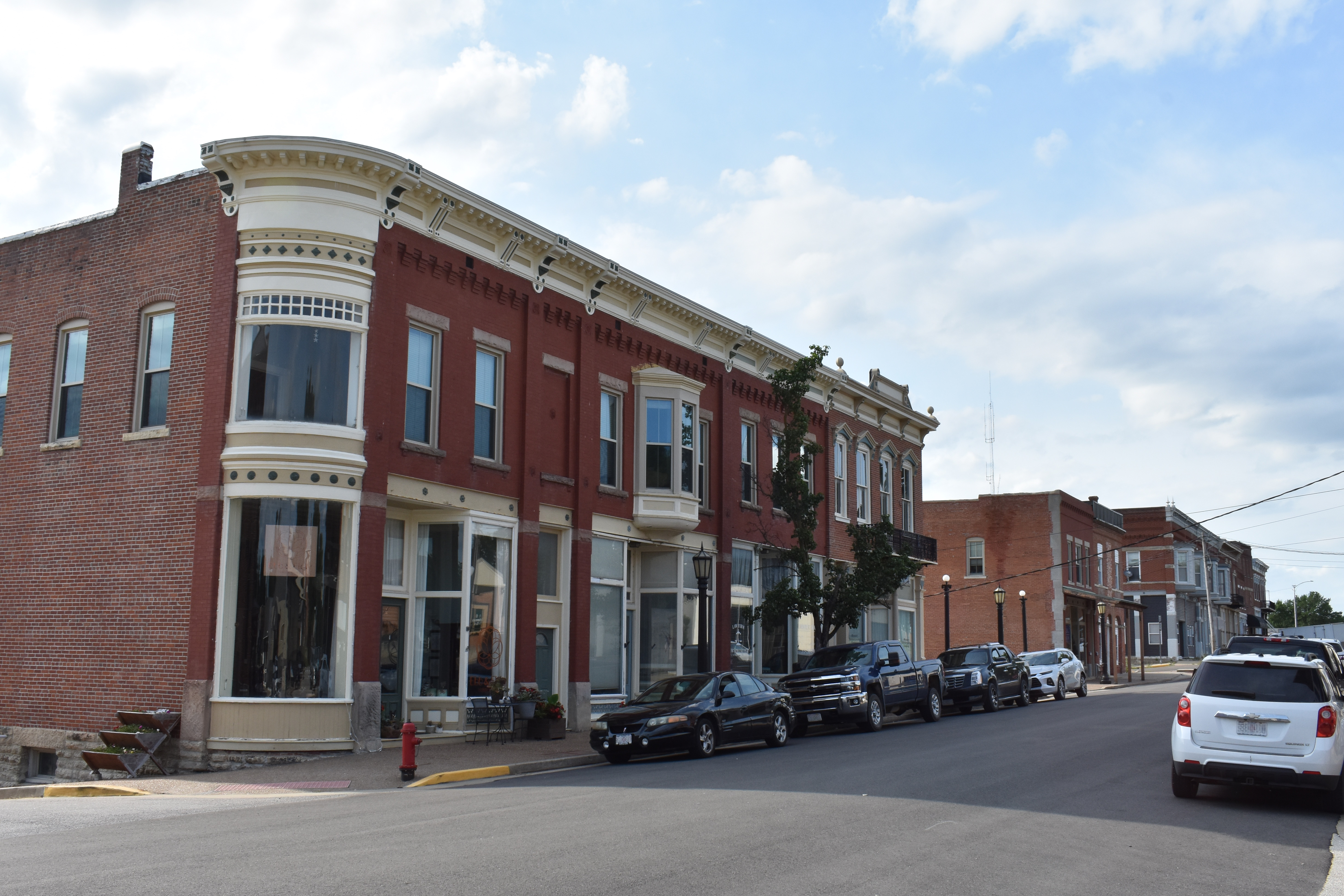
- Gray-Wood Buildings, 2026

- Location within Missouri Location within the United States
- Location: 401-407 N. High St., California, Missouri
- Coordinates: 38°38′15″N 92°33′55″W
- Area: less than one acre
- Built: 1869
- Built by: Meyer, William
- NRHP reference No.: 84002594
- Added to NRHP: January 19, 1984

Gray-Wood Buildings, also known as the Inglish, Kay & Cartwright Office Building and White Residence & Gallery, are four contiguous two-story commercial buildings located at California, Moniteau County, Missouri. They were built in 1869, and consist of a complex of four storefronts, constructed of brick with a stone foundation and a flat roof. Each building features differing design details including decorative cast metal columns and brick columns with vermiculated bases and caps.

It was added to the National Register of Historic Places in 1984.
