= Old Barnhill Building =

- U.S. National Register of Historic Places
- Location within Missouri Location within the United States
- Location: 301 N. High St., California, Missouri
- Coordinates: 38°38′5″N 92°33′56″W
- Area: less than one acre
- Built: c. 1892
- Architectural style: Italianate
- NRHP reference No.: 82003151
- Added to NRHP: April 12, 1982

The Old Barnhill Building is a historic commercial building located in California, Missouri. It was built about 1892, and is a two-story, Italianate style red brick building. It measures 25 feet by 60 feet and has a flat roof. It features cast iron embellishments.

It was added to the National Register of Historic Places in 1982.
