= Taylorville Courthouse Square Historic District =

Historic district in Illinois, United States

- U.S. National Register of Historic Places
- U.S. Historic district
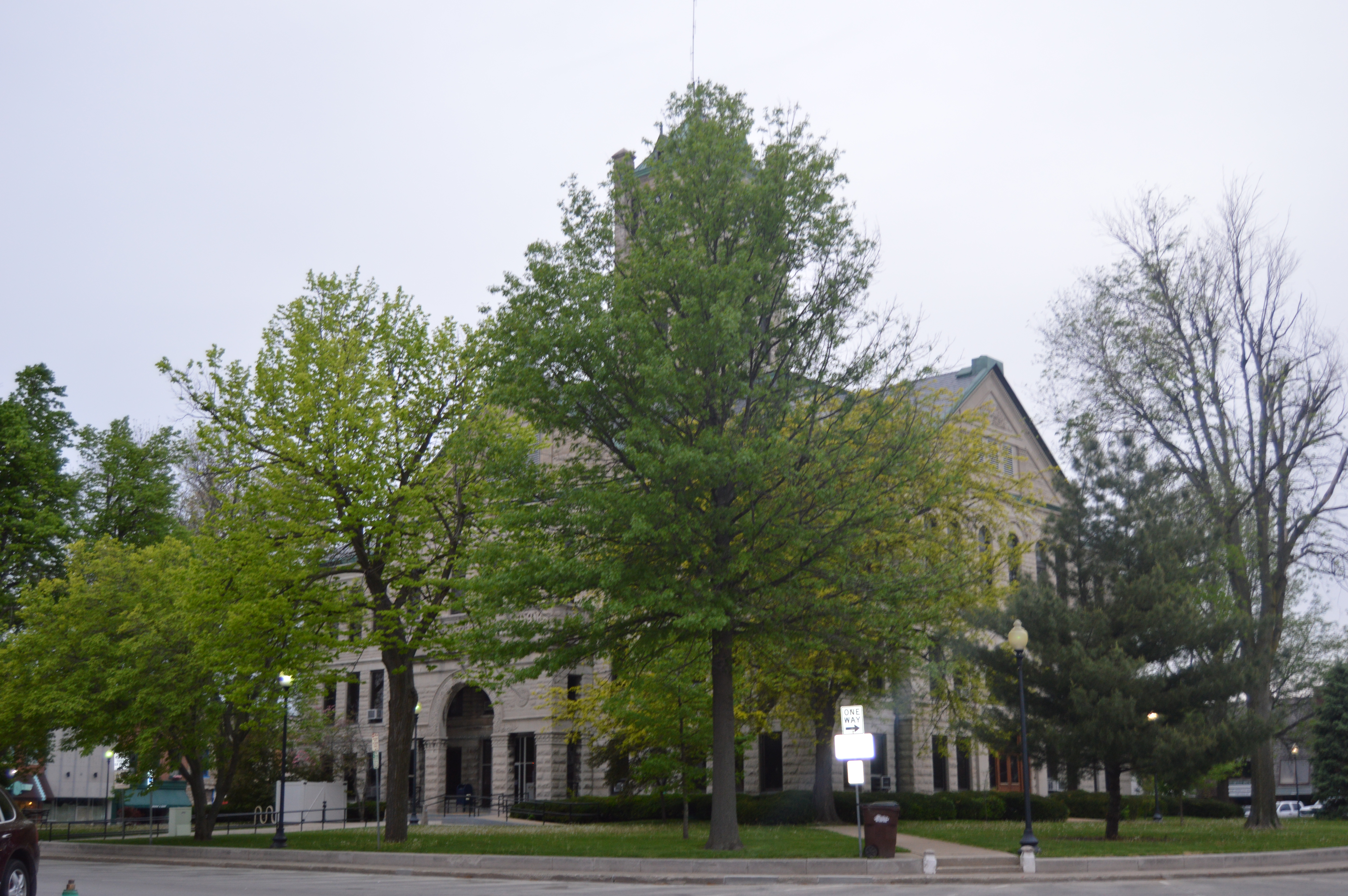
- Christian County Courthouse

- Location within Illinois Location within the United States
- Location: Roughly bounded by Vine, Walnut, Adams, and Webster Sts., Taylorville, Illinois
- Coordinates: 39°32′53″N 89°17′42″W
- Area: 19.7 acres (8.0 ha)
- NRHP reference No.: 85003058
- Added to NRHP: December 2, 1985

The Taylorville Courthouse Square Historic District is a 19.7-acre (8.0 ha) historic district located in downtown Taylorville, Illinois. The district encompasses most of Taylorville's downtown business center; while it is primarily commercial, it also includes several important government buildings. The Christian County Courthouse, a Romanesque building constructed in 1902, forms the centerpiece of the district. While development in the district began in the late 1830s, only two buildings in the district predate 1875. The first major growth period represented in the district occurred from 1875 to 1900; the commercial buildings from this period feature Italianate, Romanesque, Beaux-Arts, and Queen Anne designs. Another period of construction followed the courthouse's opening; in the ensuing decades, several Classical Revival and Prairie School buildings opened, as did the Mission Revival public library. Since 1935, the district has remained largely intact.

The district was added to the National Register of Historic Places on December 2, 1985.
