= Old California City Hall and Fire Station =

- U.S. National Register of Historic Places
- Location within Missouri Location within the United States
- Location: 101 N. High St., California, Missouri
- Coordinates: 38°37′58″N 92°33′55″W
- Area: less than one acre
- Built: 1892
- Architectural style: Italianate
- NRHP reference No.: 82003152
- Added to NRHP: April 12, 1982

Old California City Hall and Fire Station is a historic city hall and fire station located at California, Moniteau County, Missouri. It was built about 1892, and is a two-story, Italianate style red brick building. It has two one-story brick additions. It features decorative brickwork at the roof line, arched window and door openings and an ornamental cast iron balcony.

It was added to the National Register of Historic Places in 1982.
