= Court Square–Dexter Avenue Historic District =

Historic district in Alabama, United States

- U.S. National Register of Historic Places
- U.S. Historic district
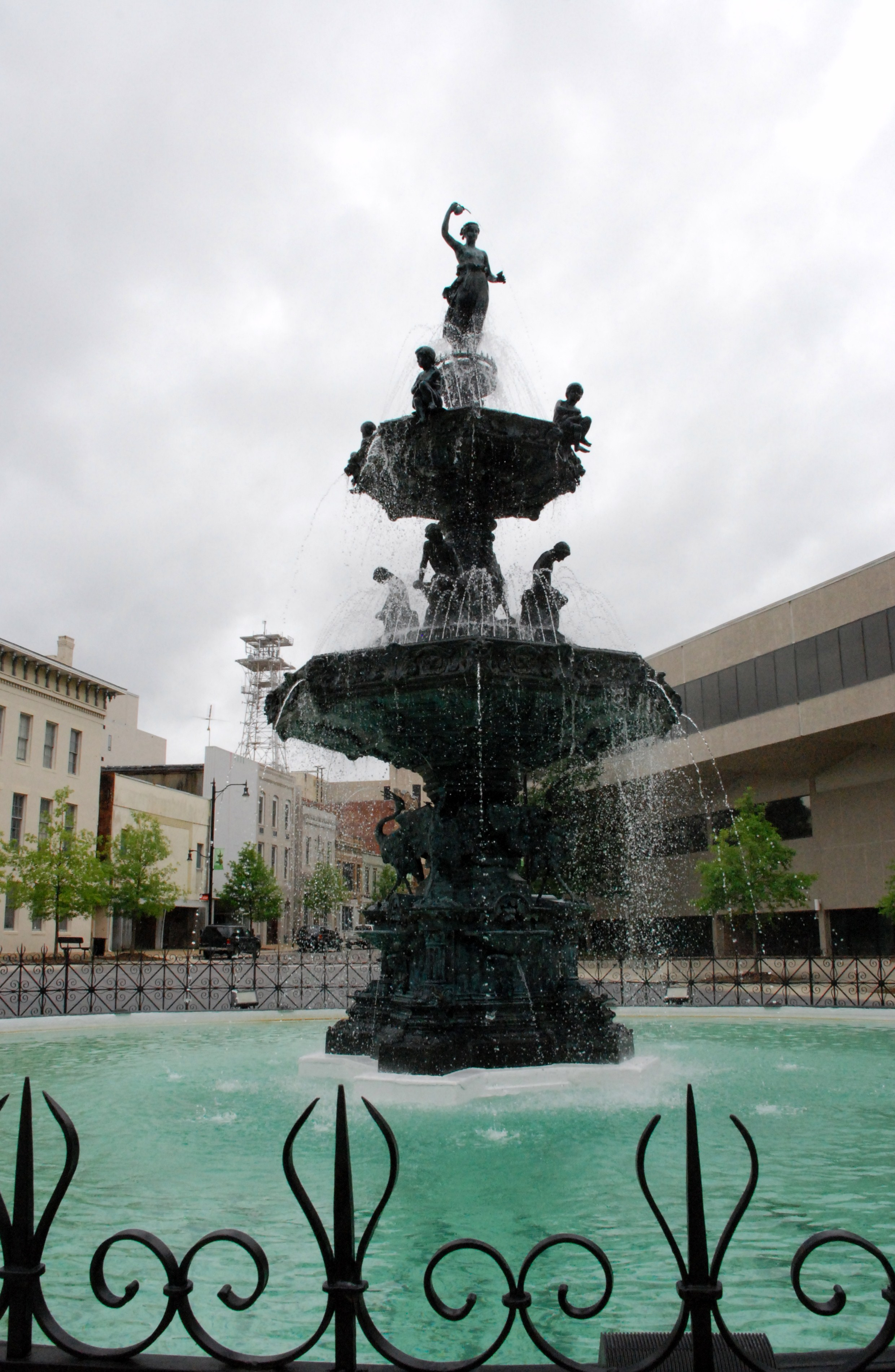
- Court Square Fountain, installed in 1885

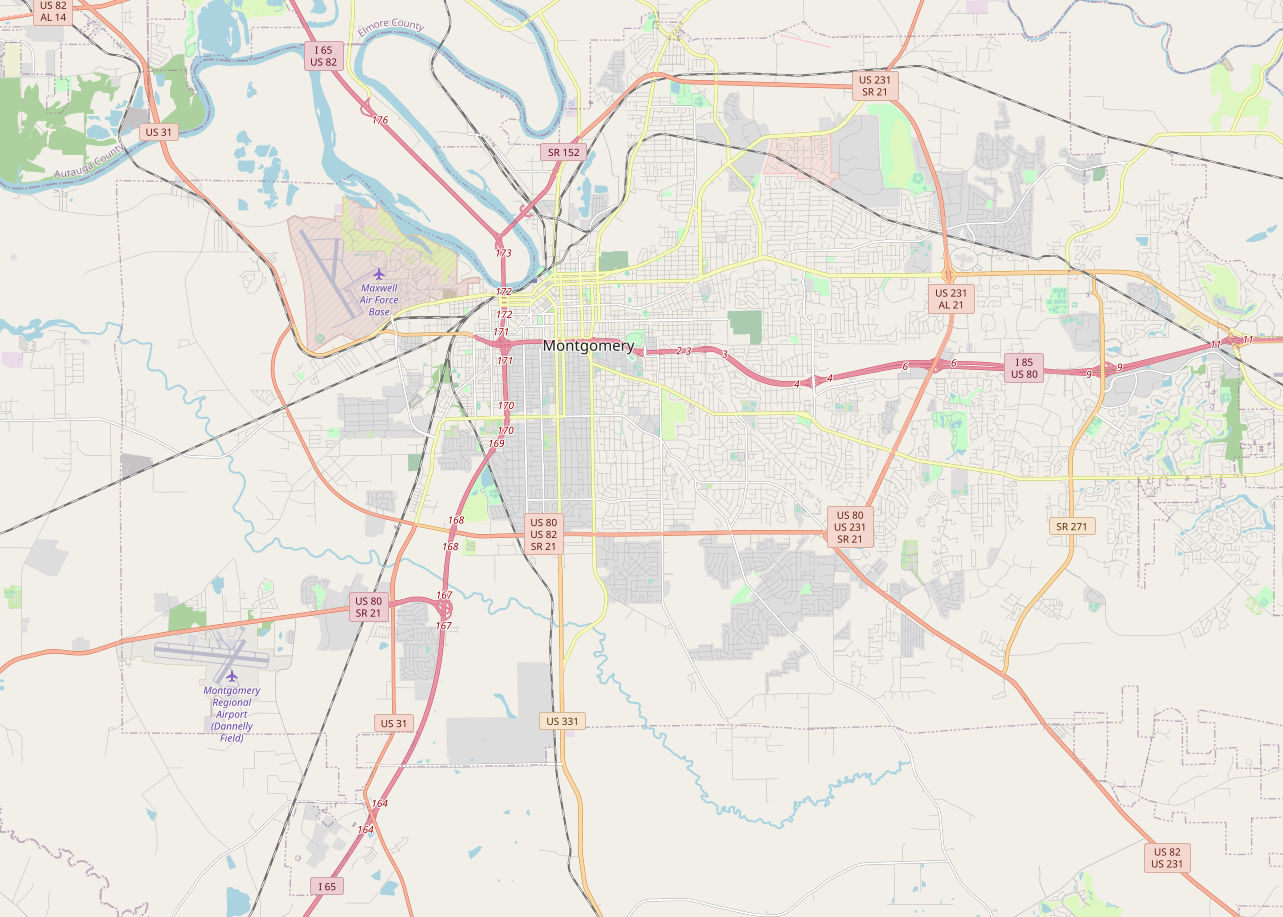
- Location within Montgomery, Alabama Location within Alabama Location within the United States
- Location: 21--35 Court St., 1--2 Dexter Ave., 18--24 N. Court St., and Court Sq. (original); Roughly Dexter Ave., Perry, Court, and Monroe Sts. (increase) Montgomery, Alabama
- Coordinates: 32°22′38″N 86°18′33″W
- Area: 3.4 acres (1.4 ha) (original); 14.2 acres (5.7 ha) (increase)
- Architectural style: Italianate, Late 19th and 20th Century Revivals, Late Victorian
- NRHP reference No.: 82002062 (original); 84000697 (increase)

Significant dates
- Added to NRHP: March 1, 1982
- Boundary increase: August 30, 1984

The Court Square–Dexter Avenue Historic District is a 17.6-acre (7.1 ha) historic district in downtown Montgomery, Alabama, United States. Centered on the Court Square Fountain, the district includes twenty-seven contributing buildings and two objects. It is roughly bounded by Dexter Avenue, Perry, Court and Monroe streets. Architectural styles in the district include Italianate, Late Victorian, and various Revival styles. It was placed on the National Register of Historic Places on March 1, 1982. The boundaries were subsequently increased on August 30, 1984.

== Contributing properties ==
- Court Square Fountain
