= West Liberty Courthouse Square Historic District =

Historic district in Missouri, United States

- U.S. National Register of Historic Places
- U.S. Historic district
- Location within Missouri Location within the United States
- Location: 12-16 N. Main St., Liberty, Missouri
- Coordinates: 39°14′47″N 94°25′14″W
- Area: less than one acre
- Built: 1877
- Architectural style: Italianate, Two-Part Commercial Block
- MPS: Liberty MPS
- NRHP reference No.: 92001681
- Added to NRHP: December 28, 1992

West Liberty Courthouse Square Historic District is a national historic district located at Liberty, Clay County, Missouri. It encompasses three contributing buildings in the central business district of Liberty. The adjoining buildings were built between 1877 and 1885, and are representative examples of Italianate style commercial architecture.

It was listed on the National Register of Historic Places in 1992.
