= Courthouse Square Historic District (Mason, Michigan) =

- U.S. National Register of Historic Places
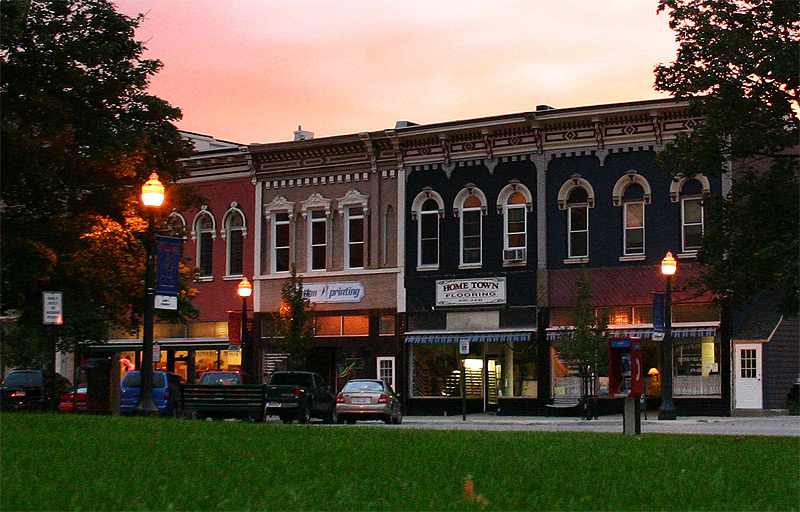
- Interactive map
- Location: Bounded by Park, E. Columbia, Rodgers and South, Mason, Michigan
- Area: 67 acres (27 ha)
- Architect: Bowd, Edwyn A.; Et al.
- Architectural style: Colonial Revival, Bungalow/craftsman, Late Victorian
- MPS: Mason Michigan Historic MRA
- NRHP reference No.: 85001243
- Added to NRHP: June 6, 1985

The Courthouse Square Historic District is a commercial and residential historic district, roughly bounded by Park, East Columbia, Rodgers and South Streets, in Mason, Michigan. It was listed on the National Register of Historic Places in 1985.

== History ==
Mason was founded in 1838 by the investment company of Charles Noble from Monroe, Michigan. He established a sawmill/gristmill complex at the site and platted the first section of the village. The 1838 platting included what is now the courthouse square and thirty surrounding blocks, encompassing much of the current historic district. Settlers soon arrived, and the square became the central focus of commercial development. A road to Lansing was started in 1839, and in 1840 Mason became the county seat, attracting more development. The first courthouse was built in 1858. Additional sections were platted in 1866, and Mason was incorporated as a city in 1875. A population boom occurred in the 1880s, with the population reaching 2200 people in 1887. The area around the courthouse square became solidly commercial.

Development slowed in the early 1900s, so that older housing stock constructed near downtown was preserved from further expansion; some of these residential structures still stand in the district. The current Ingham County Courthouse was constructed in 1903–05.

== Description ==
The Courthouse Square Historic District is an eleven-block area containing the commercial heart of Mason. It includes the Ingham County Courthouse and surrounding commercial, civic, and religious buildings, as well as two historic residential neighborhoods bracketing the downtown. In addition to the courthouse, important civic buildings include the library and the post office, as well as a school and three churches. There are a total of 181 structures in the district, of which 164 contribute to the historic quality of the district.

The residential neighborhoods are similar in nature, both having tree-lined streets, moderate set-backs, and a mixture of architectural styles, including Greek Revival, Italianate, Gothic Revival, Queen Anne, and Craftsman. The houses have similar construction materials, such as metal roofs, simple wooden door and window surrounds, and clapboard-sheathed wood framing. Despite the differences in architectural styles, the scale of the houses make a consistent streetscape.
