= Elizabethtown Courthouse Square and Commercial District =

Historic district in Kentucky, United States

- U.S. National Register of Historic Places
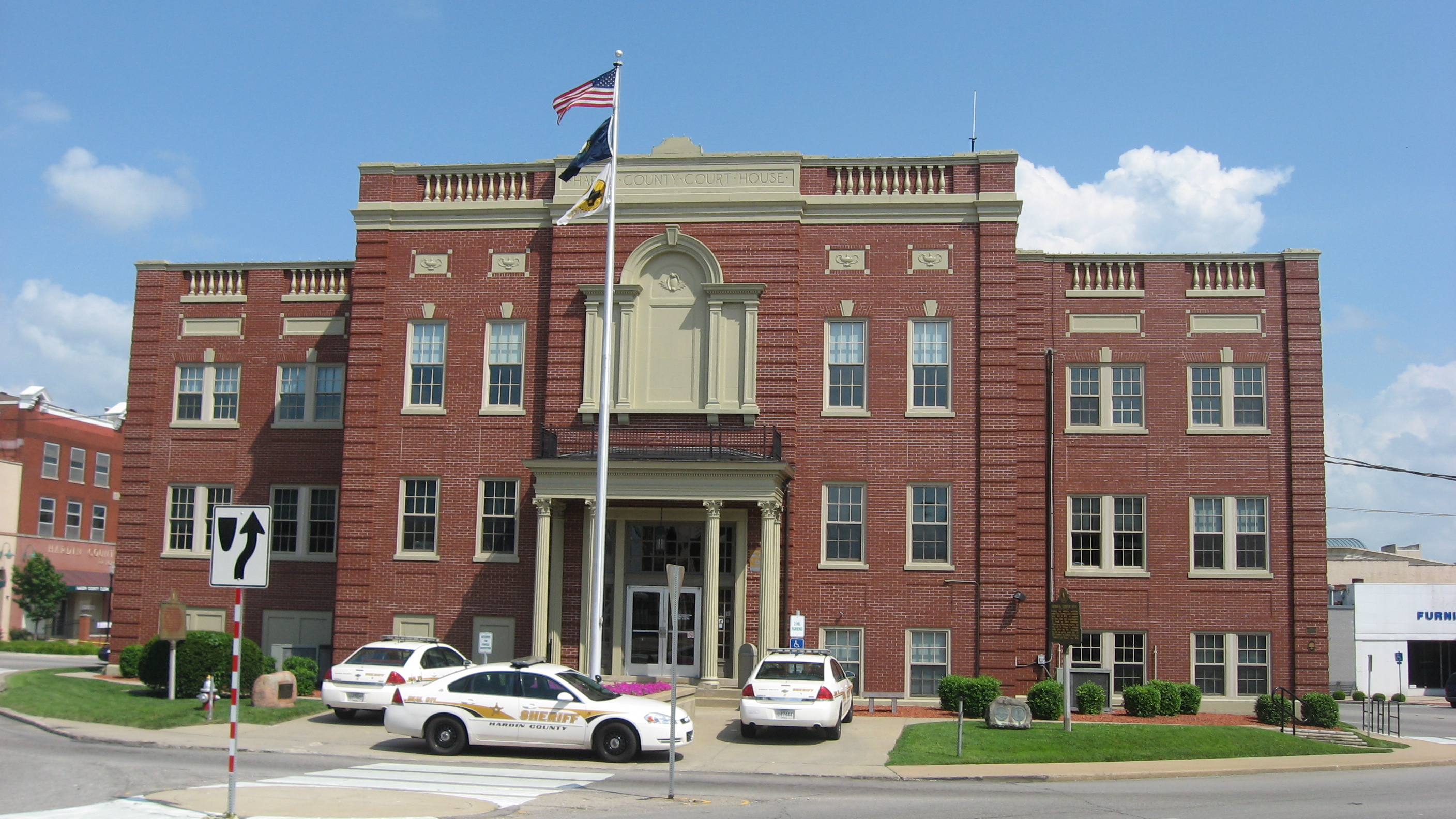

- Location within Kentucky Location within the United States
- Location: KY 61, Elizabethtown, Kentucky
- Coordinates: 37°41′35″N 85°51′29″W
- Area: 10 acres (4.0 ha)
- Architect: Multiple builder = Multiple
- Architectural style: Late 19th and 20th Century Revivals, Italianate
- NRHP reference No.: 80001535
- Added to NRHP: March 19, 1980

The Elizabethtown Courthouse Square and Commercial District, in Elizabethtown, Kentucky, is a 10 acres (4.0 ha) historic district which was listed on the National Register of Historic Places in 1980. The listing included 38 contributing buildings.

It includes the Hardin County Courthouse, built in 1933 in Georgian Revival style. The courthouse has a three-story brick central section with a slightly projecting entrance pavilion, which has a shallow portico. The courthouse replaced an 1873 courthouse which was damaged in 1932 by a fire.

The district is located on Kentucky Route 61. It consists of the courthouse square and one block of West Dixie street west of the courthouse, containing the surviving historic core of the city. It consists of two- and three-story brick buildings, 38 out of 40 being deemed contributing.
