= High Point Historic District =

Historic district in Missouri, United States

- U.S. National Register of Historic Places
- U.S. Historic district
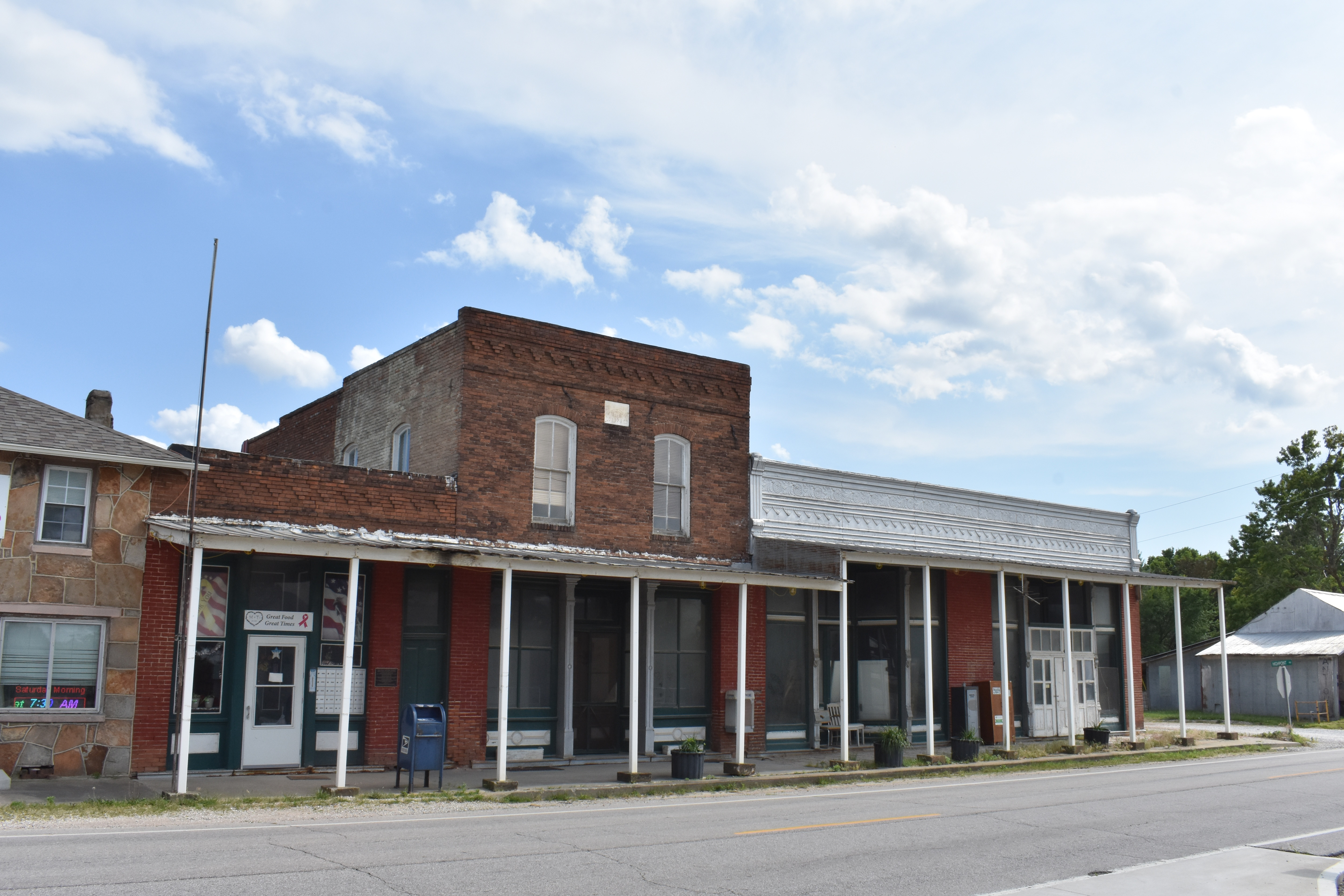
- High Point Historic District

- Location within Missouri Location within the United States
- Location: 61235-61243 MO C, High Point, Missouri
- Coordinates: 38°29′4″N 92°35′24″W
- Area: less than one acre
- Architectural style: 1 & 2 Part Commercial Block
- NRHP reference No.: 04001561
- Added to NRHP: January 26, 2005

High Point Historic District is a national historic district located at High Point, Moniteau County, Missouri. The district encompasses seven contributing buildings in the central business district of High Point. It developed between about 1874 and 1954, and includes representative examples of commercial architecture. Contributing buildings include the J. F. Tising & Sons Store (1874, 1892), East Tisinq Store Building / IOOF Meeting Hall (c. 1874), Post Office (c. 1874), McGill Cafe / Residence (c. 1941), and two frame and one brick privy.

It was listed on the National Register of Historic Places in 2005.
