= Russellville, Missouri =

- City
- City of Russellville
- Location of Russellville, Missouri
- Coordinates: 38°30′46″N 92°26′19″W
- Country: United States
- State: Missouri
- County: Cole
- Township: Moreau
- Founded: 1838
- Incorporated: 1848
- Named after: Joseph Russell

Government
  - Mayor: Sharon Morgan

Area
  - Total: 0.80 sq mi (2.07 km^{2})
  - Land: 0.80 sq mi (2.07 km^{2})
  - Water: 0 sq mi (0.00 km^{2})
- Elevation: 873 ft (266 m)

Population (2020)
  - Total: 778
  - Density: 973.7/sq mi (375.96/km^{2})
- Time zone: UTC-6 (Central (CST))
  - Summer (DST): UTC-5 (CDT)
- ZIP code: 65074
- Area code: 573
- FIPS code: 29-63704
- GNIS feature ID: 2396458
- Website: cityofrussellvillemo.com

Russellville is a city in Cole County, Missouri, United States. The population was 778 at the 2020 census. It is part of the Jefferson City, Missouri Metropolitan Statistical Area.

== History ==
Russellville was platted in 1838, and named in honor of Joseph Russell, the original owner of the town site. A post office called Russellville has been in operation since 1848.

The Louis Bruce Farmstead Historic District was listed on the National Register of Historic Places in 1992.

== Geography ==
According to the United States Census Bureau, the city has a total area of 0.80 square miles (2.07 km^{2}), all land.

== Demographics ==
Historical population
Census	Pop.	Note	%±
1880	67		—
1900	295		—
1910	335		13.6%
1920	364		8.7%
1930	313		−14.0%
1940	319		1.9%
1950	336		5.3%
1960	442		31.5%
1970	557		26.0%
1980	667		19.7%
1990	869		30.3%
2000	758		−12.8%
2010	807		6.5%
2020	778		−3.6%
U.S. Decennial Census

=== 2010 census ===
As of the census of 2010, there were 807 people, 323 households, and 212 families living in the city. The population density was 1,008.8 inhabitants per square mile (389.5/km^{2}). There were 360 housing units at an average density of 450.0 per square mile (173.7/km^{2}). The racial makeup of the city was 96.9% White, 1.7% African American, 0.1% Native American, 0.2% Pacific Islander, 0.2% from other races, and 0.7% from two or more races. Hispanic or Latino of any race were 0.4% of the population.

There were 323 households, of which 39.6% had children under the age of 18 living with them, 46.7% were married couples living together, 13.6% had a female householder with no husband present, 5.3% had a male householder with no wife present, and 34.4% were non-families. 31.3% of all households were made up of individuals, and 11.8% had someone living alone who was 65 years of age or older. The average household size was 2.50 and the average family size was 3.14.

The median age in the city was 33.3 years. 30.2% of residents were under the age of 18; 7.8% were between the ages of 18 and 24; 29% were from 25 to 44; 23.5% were from 45 to 64; and 9.5% were 65 years of age or older. The gender makeup of the city was 48.3% male and 51.7% female.

=== 2000 census ===
As of the census of 2000, there were 758 people, 305 households, and 203 families living in the city. The population density was 1,003.4 inhabitants per square mile (387.4/km^{2}). There were 346 housing units at an average density of 458.0 per square mile (176.8/km^{2}). The racial makeup of the city was 97.89% White, 0.66% Native American, 0.26% Asian, 0.13% from other races, and 1.06% from two or more races. Hispanic or Latino of any race were 1.98% of the population.

There were 305 households, out of which 38.7% had children under the age of 18 living with them, 50.2% were married couples living together, 13.1% had a female householder with no husband present, and 33.4% were non-families. 30.5% of all households were made up of individuals, and 16.1% had someone living alone who was 65 years of age or older. The average household size was 2.49 and the average family size was 3.14.

In the city, the population was spread out, with 31.0% under the age of 18, 7.9% from 18 to 24, 27.2% from 25 to 44, 20.6% from 45 to 64, and 13.3% who were 65 years of age or older. The median age was 33 years. For every 100 females, there were 87.2 males. For every 100 females age 18 and over, there were 78.5 males.

The median income for a household in the city was $34,408, and the median income for a family was $41,250. Males had a median income of $30,100 versus $20,972 for females. The per capita income for the city was $14,812. About 7.5% of families and 9.5% of the population were below the poverty line, including 15.9% of those under age 18 and 4.7% of those age 65 or over.

== Education ==
It is in the Cole County R-I School District. The Cole County R-1 School District serves Russellville with an elementary school and a junior/senior high School, Home of the Indians. The elementary building originally served grades K-8, but in 2022, grades 7th and 8th were transferred to the high school building. The high school building was built in the year 2000.

In 2022, Russellville won the Missouri state class 2 high school baseball championship.
