= Lincoln Courthouse Square Historic District =

Historic district in Illinois, United States

- U.S. National Register of Historic Places
- U.S. Historic district
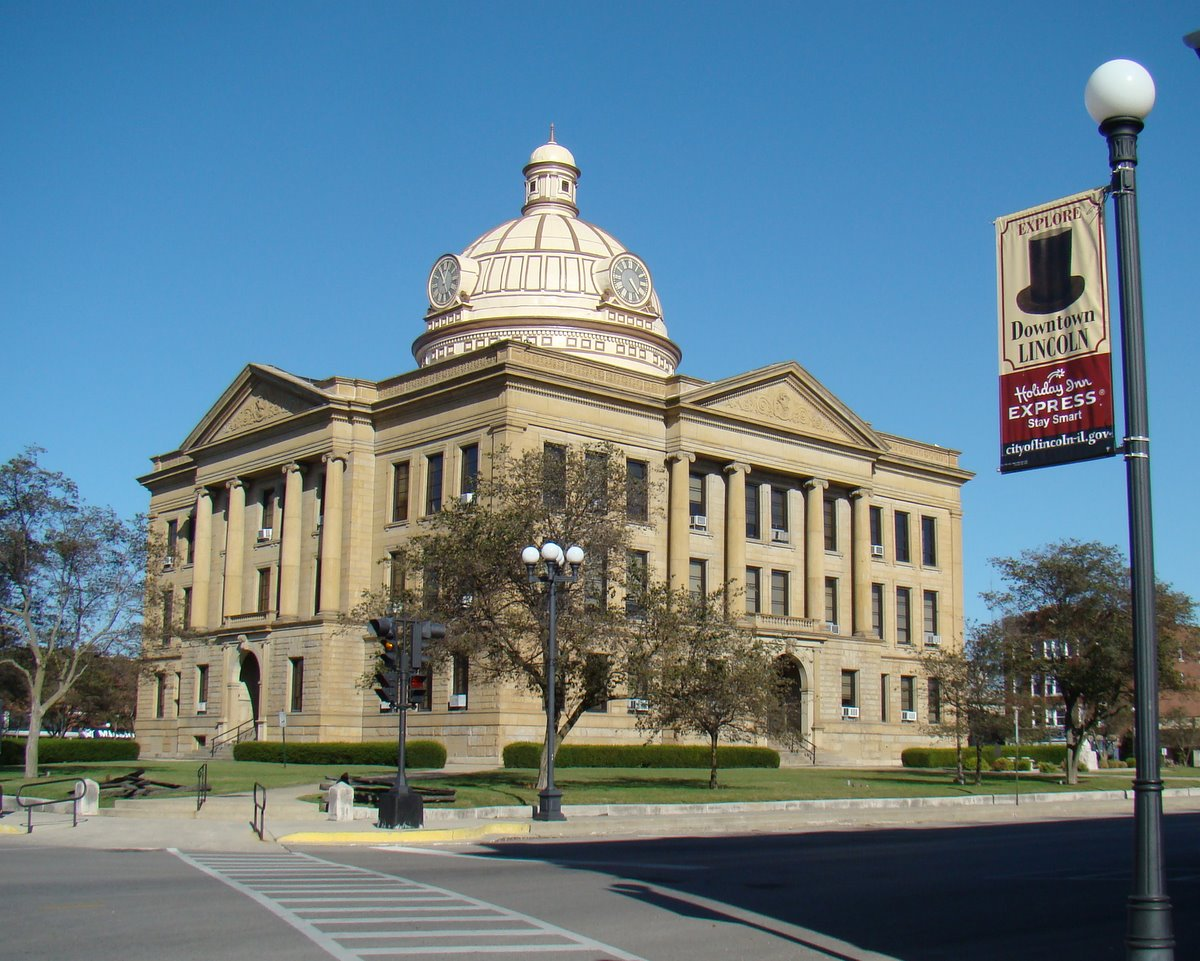
- Logan County Courthouse

- Location within Illinois Location within the United States
- Location: Lincoln, Illinois
- Coordinates: 40°8′49″N 89°21′47″W
- Architect: Deal, John M.; Et al.
- Architectural style: Late 19th And 20th Century Revivals, Late Victorian, Italianate
- NRHP reference No.: 85003166
- Added to NRHP: December 24, 1985

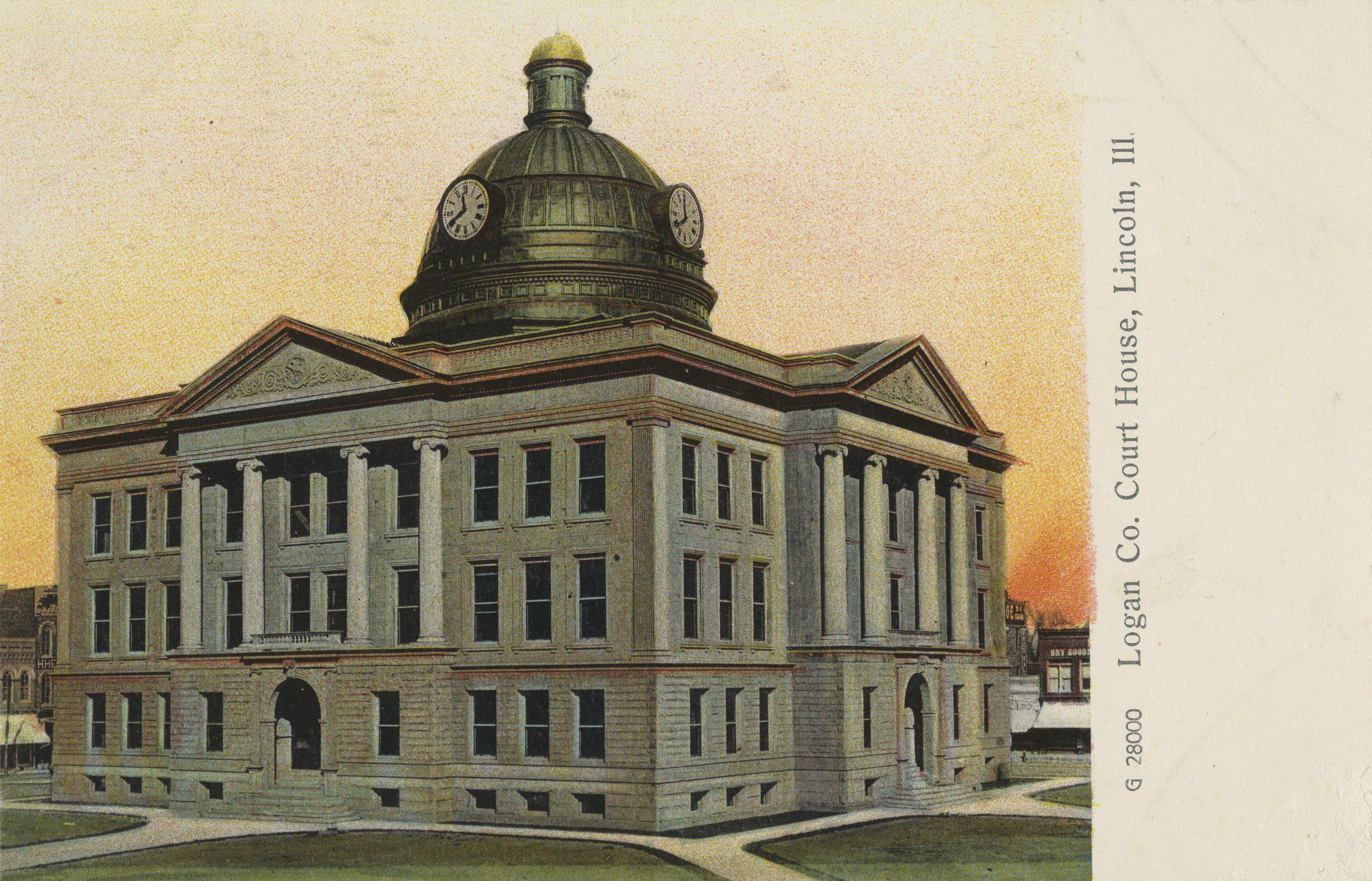
Logan County courthouse in Lincoln, Illinois, circa 1901-1907

The Lincoln Courthouse Square Historic District is located in Lincoln, Illinois in Logan County. The district is roughly bounded by Sangamon, Pekin, Chicago, Delavan, Broadway, and Pulaski Streets. The district includes 112 buildings, 89 of which are contributing buildings.

The Logan County Courthouse and the surrounding courthouse square are included in the district, and much of the surrounding business district was built around the courthouse. The courthouse was built in 1854, the year after Lincoln was platted. Other government buildings in the district include the Lincoln city hall, the public library, and the post office.

The early commercial buildings in the district are mainly brick Italianate structures. After 1900, buildings in a number of other styles were added to the district. The Scully Building is one of the more significant commercial buildings in the district; the Richardsonian Romanesque building served as the headquarters of Scully Estate Holdings, a major real estate company dealing in farmland.

The district was added to the National Register of Historic Places on December 24, 1985.

== See also ==
- Logan County, Illinois
- Lincoln, Illinois
