= California, Missouri =

City in Missouri, U.S.

- City
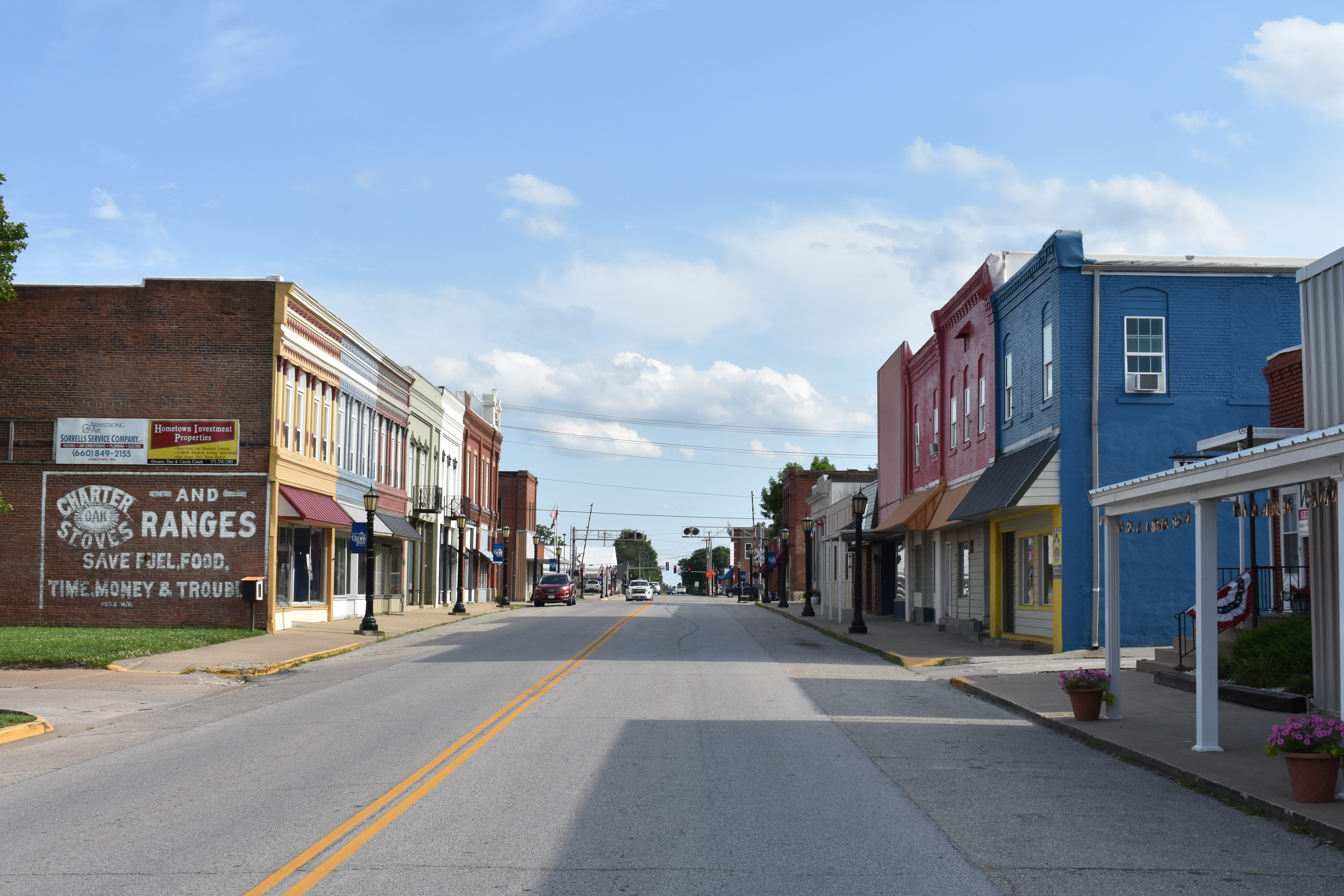
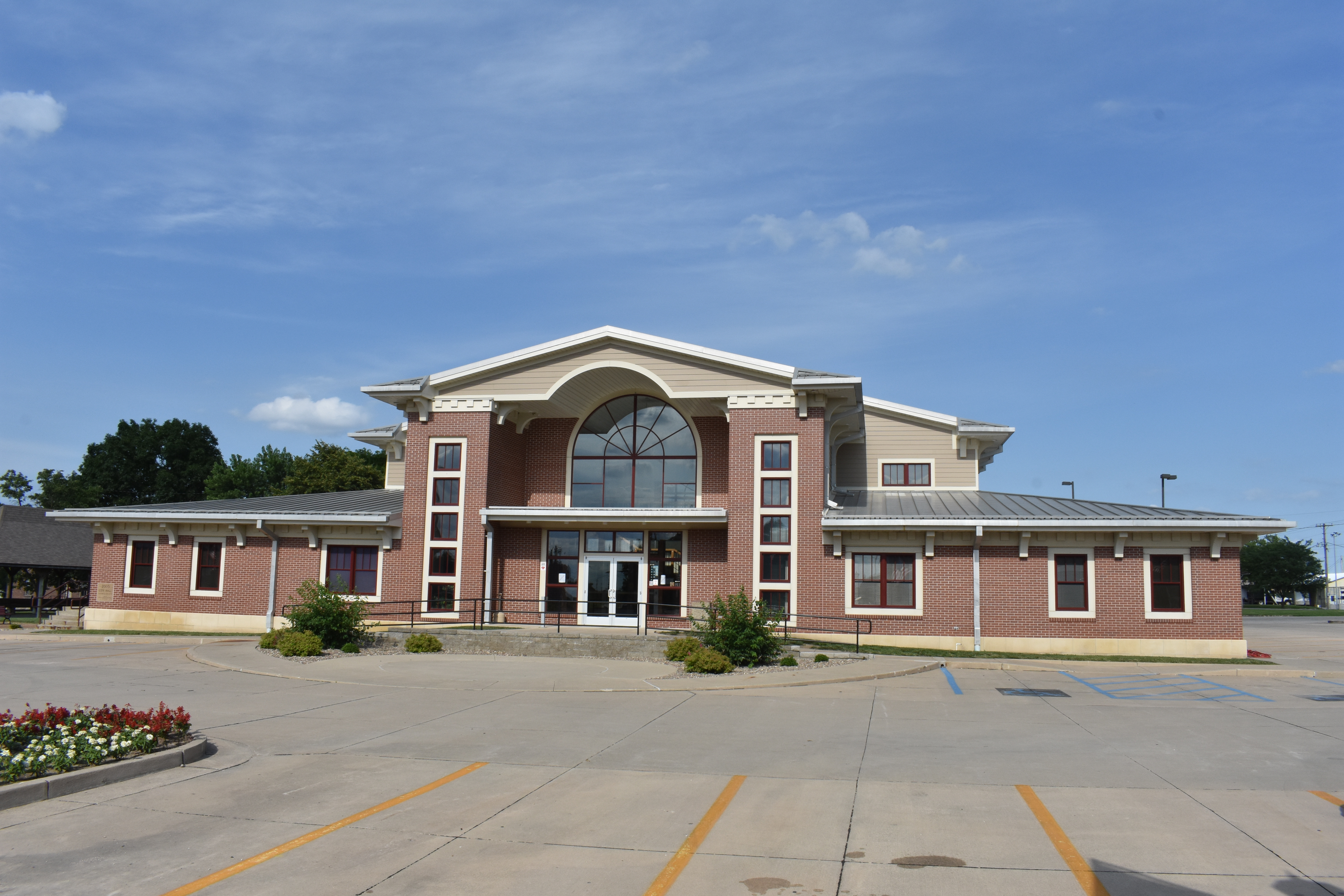
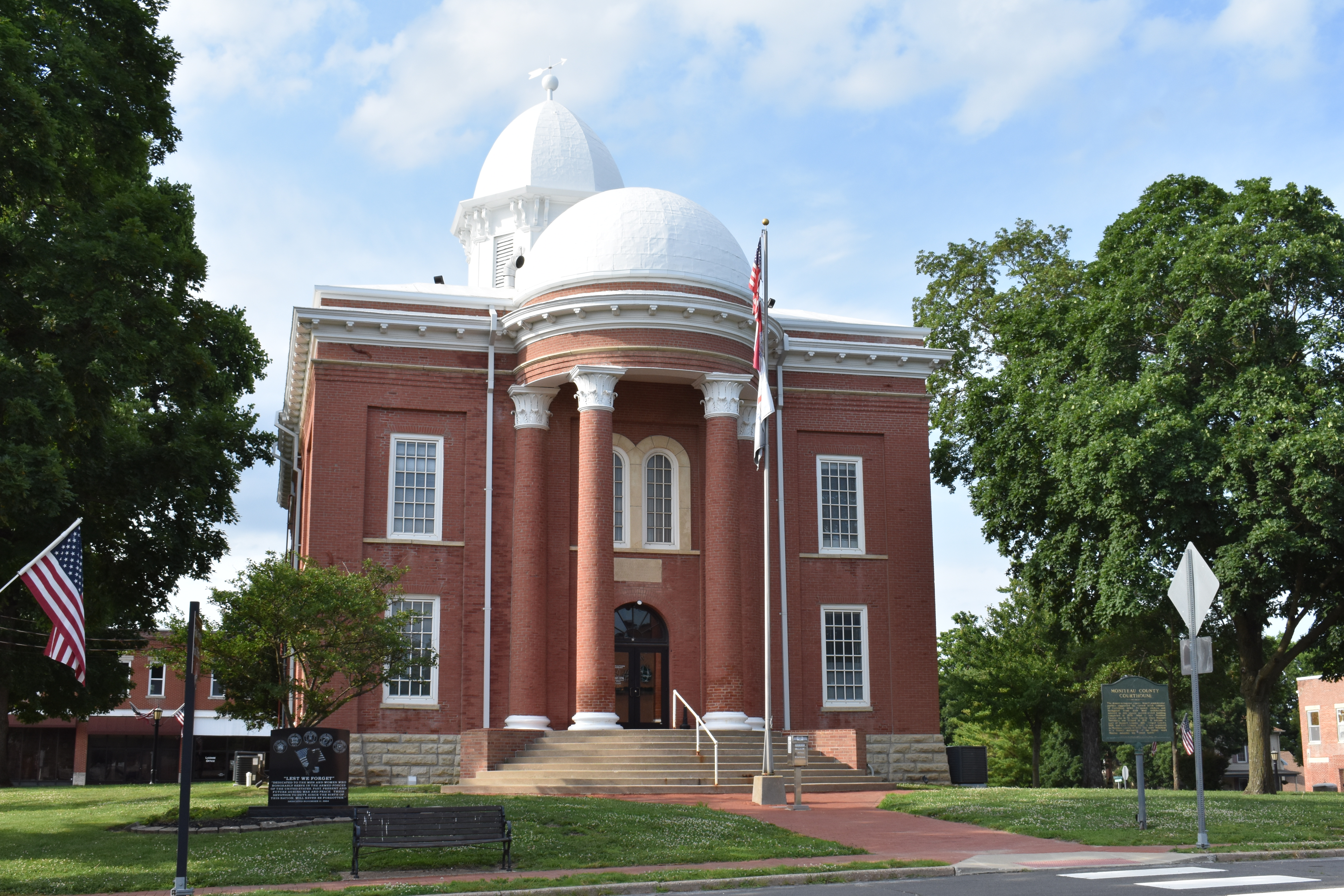
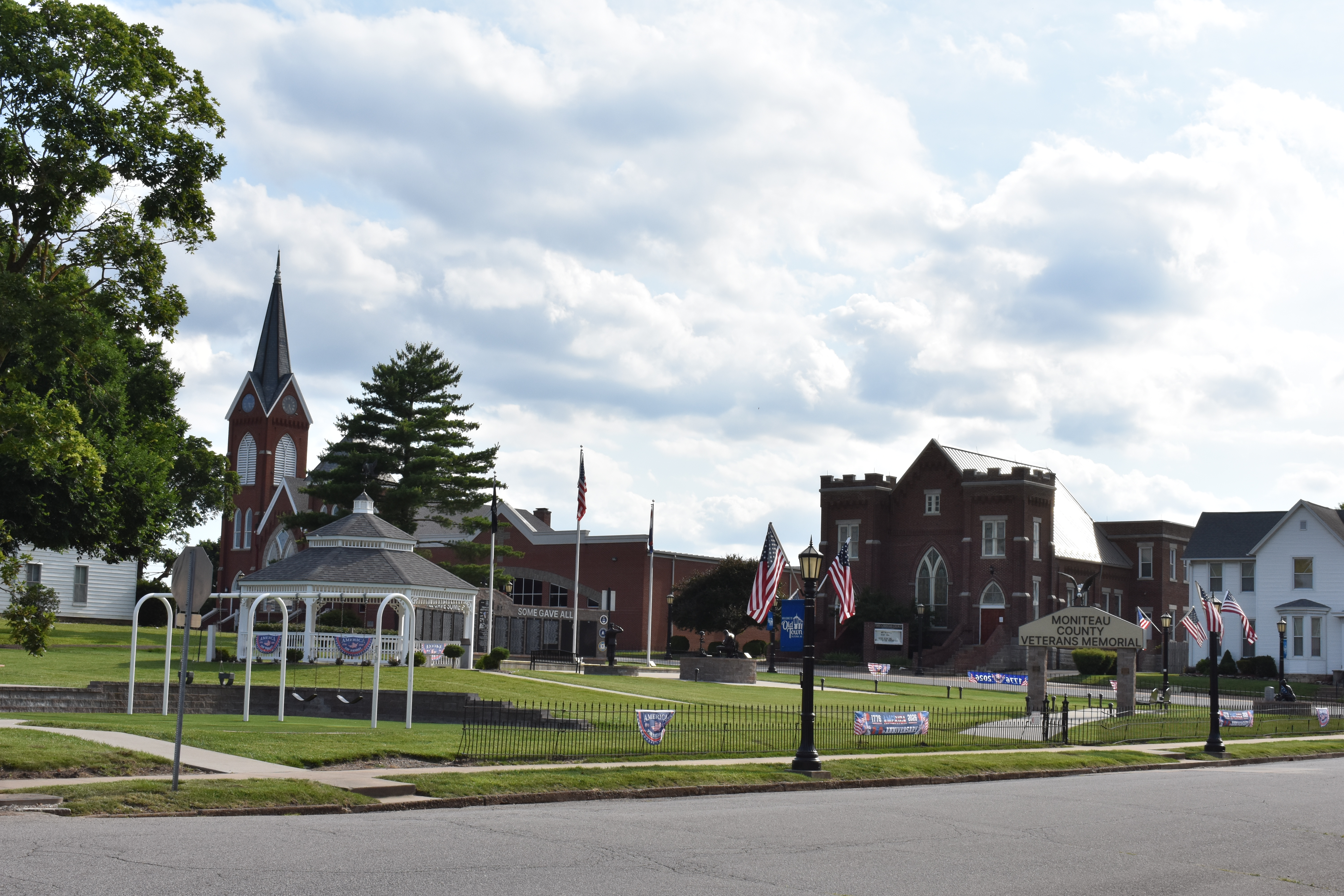
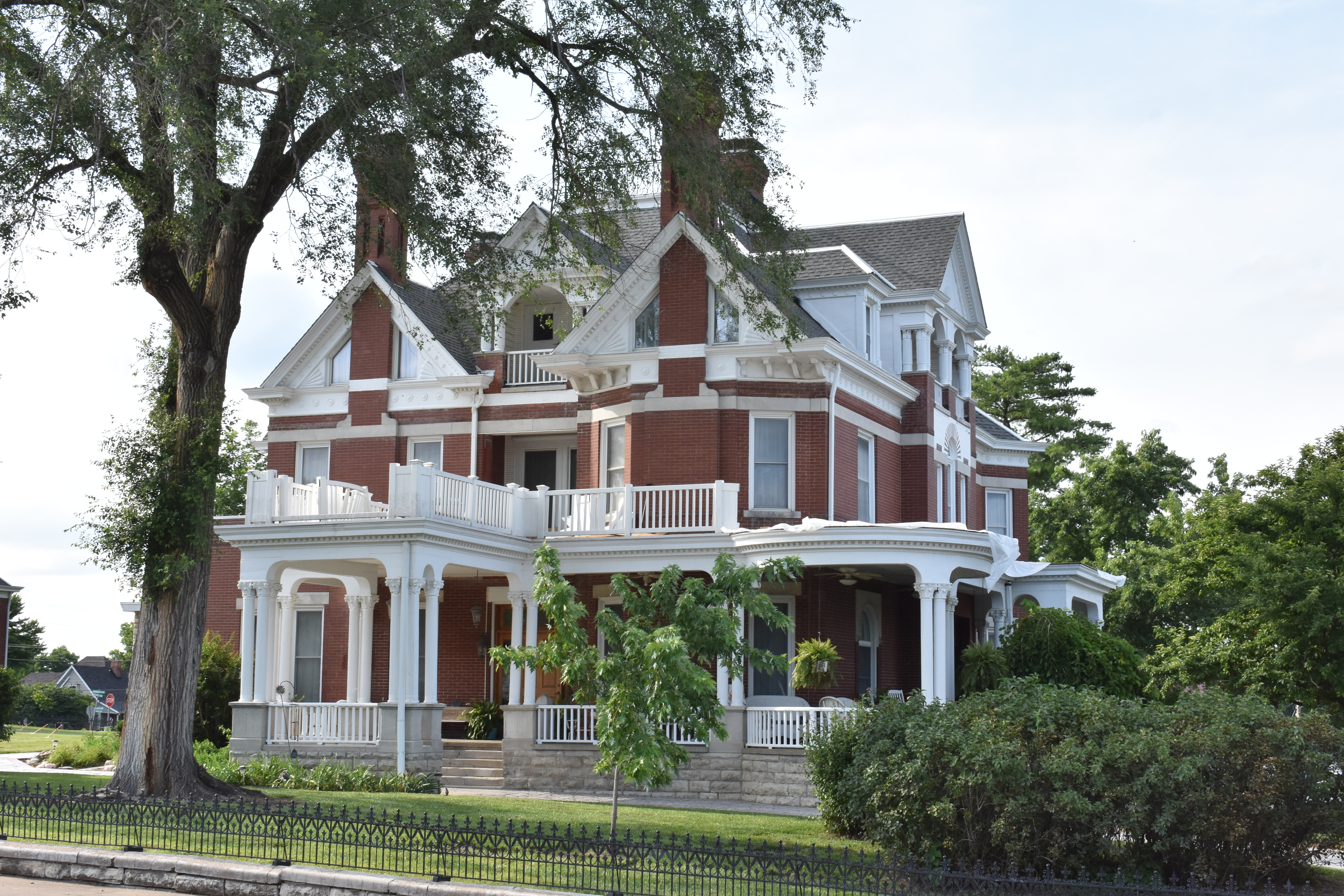
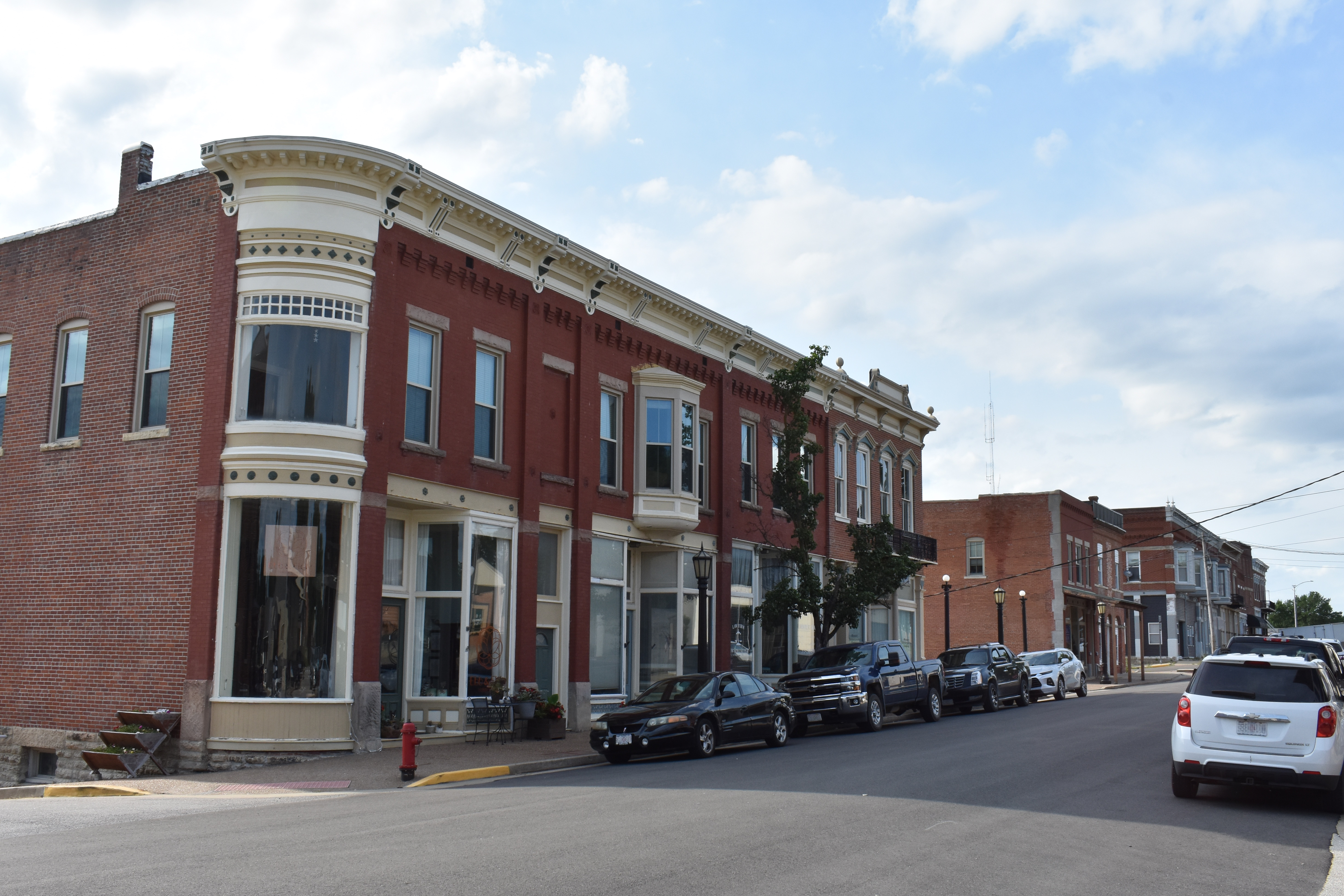
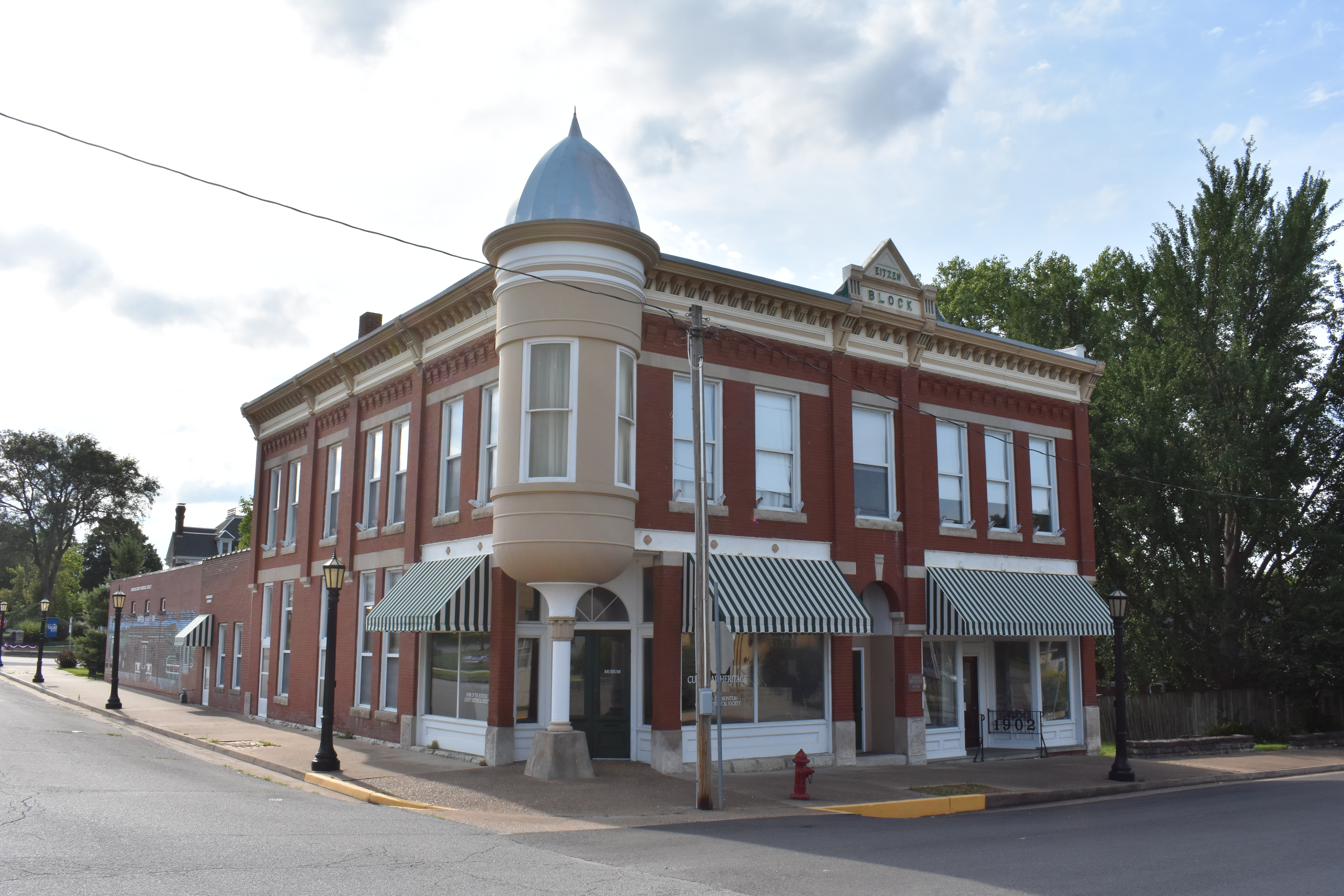
- Downtown City Hall Moniteau County Courthouse City Park Eitzen Mansion Gray-Wood Buildings Cultural Heritage Center

- Seal
- Nicknames: The Country Ham Capital of the World, Twin City, Heart of Moniteau County, Cali
- Motto: "Small enough to know you, large enough to serve you"
- Location in Moniteau County and the state of Missouri
- Coordinates: 38°37′49″N 92°34′01″W
- Country: United States
- State: Missouri
- County: Moniteau
- Founded: 1834 (as Boonesborough); 1847 (as California)
- Incorporated: 1848

Government
  - Type: Mayor/board of aldermen
  - Mayor: Mike Staton

Area
  - Total: 3.88 sq mi (10.05 km^{2})
  - Land: 3.86 sq mi (10.01 km^{2})
  - Water: 0.015 sq mi (0.04 km^{2})
- Elevation: 896 ft (273 m)

Population (2020)
  - Total: 4,498
  - Estimate (2023): 4,520
  - Density: 1,163.7/sq mi (449.29/km^{2})
- Time zone: UTC-6 (Central (CST))
  - Summer (DST): UTC-5 (CDT)
- ZIP codes: 65018, 65042
- Area code: 573
- FIPS code: 29-10468
- GNIS feature ID: 2393495
- Website: cityofcalifornia.net

California is a city in and the county seat of Moniteau County, Missouri, United States. As of the 2020 census the population was 4,498. It is the largest city in Moniteau County and the third largest city in the Jefferson City metropolitan area.

== History ==
The City of California was established in 1834. The seat of justice of Moniteau County was originally known as Boonesborough. When Moniteau County was organized in 1845, it was decided that Boonsborough would become the county seat. Because the county court was unwilling to pay for land in Boonsborough, a site was selected one-mile (1.6 km) west which became the new county seat. In 1846, the Postal Service required a new name to be selected for Boonsborough since there was already a Boonsborough in Missouri. The city was renamed to California on January 25, 1847, for the territory on the West Coast that was just then drawing attention due to progress of the overland railroad. That same year, a courthouse was erected on the square.

California was incorporated in 1848 and elected its first city officials in 1858, 10 years later.

The Weekly California News printed its first edition on September 18, 1858, and is Moniteau County's oldest established business still in operation. Today, it is known as the California Democrat.

By the end of the Civil War, California's population was around 1,000. The city had ten dry goods stores, two drug stores, a tobacco factory, a large steam flouring mill and carding machine, a high school, a printing office, and a bank.

In 1867, money was appropriated for a new courthouse, which was completed in 1868 and is still in use today.

== Demographics ==
Historical population
Census	Pop.	Note	%±
1880	1,427		—
1890	1,772		24.2%
1900	2,181		23.1%
1910	2,154		−1.2%
1920	2,218		3.0%
1930	2,384		7.5%
1940	2,525		5.9%
1950	2,627		4.0%
1960	2,788		6.1%
1970	3,105		11.4%
1980	3,381		8.9%
1990	3,465		2.5%
2000	4,005		15.6%
2010	4,278		6.8%
2020	4,498		5.1%
2024 (est.)	4,520		0.5%
U.S. Decennial Census

=== 2020 census ===
As of the 2020 census, the city had 4,498 residents. The median age was 36.9 years. 26.8% of residents were under the age of 18 and 17.4% were 65 years of age or older. For every 100 females, there were 90.6 males, and for every 100 females age 18 and over, there were 86.2 males age 18 and over.

There were 1,815 households, of which 34.1% had children under the age of 18 living in them. Of all households, 41.9% were married-couple households, 19.4% were households with a male householder and no spouse or partner present, and 31.9% were households with a female householder and no spouse or partner present. About 33.6% of all households were made up of individuals, and 16.4% had someone living alone who was 65 years of age or older.

There were 1,976 housing units, of which 8.1% were vacant. The homeowner vacancy rate was 2.7% and the rental vacancy rate was 9.3%.

0.0% of residents lived in urban areas, while 100.0% lived in rural areas.

Racial composition as of the 2020 census
Race	Number	Percent
White	3,735	83.0%
Black or African American	37	0.8%
American Indian and Alaska Native	40	0.9%
Asian	19	0.4%
Native Hawaiian and Other Pacific Islander	3	0.1%
Some other race	256	5.7%
Two or more races	408	9.1%
Hispanic or Latino (of any race)	632	14.1%

=== 2010 census ===
As of the census of 2010, there were 4,278 people, 1,727 households, and 1,096 families residing in the city. The population density was 1,277.0 inhabitants per square mile (493.1/km^{2}). There were 1,909 housing units at an average density of 569.9 per square mile (220.0/km^{2}). The racial makeup of the city was 91.3% White, 0.8% African American, 0.3% Native American, 0.5% Asian, 0.2% Pacific Islander, 5.7% from other races, and 1.3% from two or more races. Hispanic or Latino of any race were 10.4% of the population.

There were 1,727 households, of which 33.8% had children under the age of 18 living with them, 46.0% were married couples living together, 13.0% had a female householder with no husband present, 4.4% had a male householder with no wife present, and 36.5% were non-families. 32.0% of all households were made up of individuals, and 15.9% had someone living alone who was 65 years of age or older. The average household size was 2.42 and the average family size was 3.05.

The median age in the city was 36.6 years. 26.3% of residents were under the age of 18; 9.3% were between the ages of 18 and 24; 25.1% were from 25 to 44; 21.7% were from 45 to 64; and 17.6% were 65 years of age or older. The gender makeup of the city was 46.8% male and 53.2% female.

=== 2000 census ===
As of the census of 2000, there were 4,005 people, 1,632 households, and 1,068 families residing in the city. The population density was 1,337.3 inhabitants per square mile (516.3/km^{2}). There were 1,766 housing units at an average density of 589.7 per square mile (227.7/km^{2}). The racial makeup of the city was 93.58% White, 0.65% African American, 0.20% Native American, 0.55% Asian, 4.07% from other races, and 0.95% from two or more races. Hispanic or Latino of any race were 7.57% of the population. The Hispanic population is a fast-growing group in California.

There were 1,632 households, out of which 31.9% had children under the age of 18 living with them, 50.0% were married couples living together, 11.1% had a female householder with no husband present, and 34.5% were non-families. 30.9% of all households were made up of individuals, and 18.1% had someone living alone who was 65 years of age or older. The average household size was 2.38 and the average family size was 2.95.

In the city, the population was spread out, with 25.2% under the age of 18, 9.0% from 18 to 24, 27.1% from 25 to 44, 18.8% from 45 to 64, and 20.0% who were 65 years of age or older. The median age was 36 years. For every 100 females, there were 89.1 males. For every 100 females age 18 and over, there were 85.2 males.

The median income for a household in the city was $31,736, and the median income for a family was $39,221. Males had a median income of $25,880 versus $21,494 for females. The per capita income for the city was $17,533. About 9.6% of families and 12.0% of the population were below the poverty line, including 14.1% of those under age 18 and 9.2% of those age 65 or over.

== Geography ==
California is located in central Moniteau County. Missouri Route 87 passes through the center of the city as Oak Street, leading north 12 miles (19 km) to Jamestown and south 21 miles (34 km) to Eldon. U.S. Route 50 bypasses the city to the south, while its former route passes through the center of town as Buchanan Street. US 50 leads east 23 miles (37 km) to Jefferson City, the state capital, and west 37 miles (60 km) to Sedalia.

According to the U.S. Census Bureau, the city has a total area of 3.88 square miles (10.05 km^{2}), of which 0.01 square miles (0.03 km^{2}), or 0.36%, are water. The city sits atop a ridge which drains south to North Moreau Creek, a tributary of the Moreau River, which continues east to the Missouri River, and north to East Brush Creek, a tributary of Moniteau Creek, another tributary of the Missouri. The easternmost part of the city drains to Little Moniteau Creek.

=== Climate ===
Climate data for California, Missouri (1991–2020 normals, extremes 1954–present)
Month	Jan	Feb	Mar	Apr	May	Jun	Jul	Aug	Sep	Oct	Nov	Dec	Year
Record high °F (°C)	78 (26)	82 (28)	91 (33)	92 (33)	94 (34)	104 (40)	109 (43)	108 (42)	104 (40)	96 (36)	85 (29)	75 (24)	109 (43)
Mean daily maximum °F (°C)	39.8 (4.3)	45.1 (7.3)	55.3 (12.9)	66.0 (18.9)	74.9 (23.8)	83.5 (28.6)	87.8 (31.0)	87.1 (30.6)	79.8 (26.6)	68.2 (20.1)	54.8 (12.7)	43.8 (6.6)	65.5 (18.6)
Daily mean °F (°C)	29.8 (−1.2)	34.5 (1.4)	44.4 (6.9)	54.8 (12.7)	64.6 (18.1)	73.4 (23.0)	77.6 (25.3)	76.4 (24.7)	68.5 (20.3)	56.7 (13.7)	44.5 (6.9)	34.3 (1.3)	55.0 (12.8)
Mean daily minimum °F (°C)	19.7 (−6.8)	23.9 (−4.5)	33.4 (0.8)	43.5 (6.4)	54.3 (12.4)	63.3 (17.4)	67.4 (19.7)	65.7 (18.7)	57.2 (14.0)	45.2 (7.3)	34.2 (1.2)	24.9 (−3.9)	44.4 (6.9)
Record low °F (°C)	−17 (−27)	−14 (−26)	−10 (−23)	19 (−7)	30 (−1)	43 (6)	48 (9)	45 (7)	30 (−1)	17 (−8)	−1 (−18)	−21 (−29)	−21 (−29)
Average precipitation inches (mm)	2.01 (51)	2.31 (59)	2.97 (75)	4.90 (124)	4.98 (126)	4.41 (112)	4.71 (120)	3.88 (99)	4.11 (104)	3.78 (96)	3.17 (81)	1.92 (49)	43.15 (1,096)
Average snowfall inches (cm)	3.3 (8.4)	1.8 (4.6)	0.7 (1.8)	0.0 (0.0)	0.0 (0.0)	0.0 (0.0)	0.0 (0.0)	0.0 (0.0)	0.0 (0.0)	0.0 (0.0)	0.4 (1.0)	3.5 (8.9)	9.7 (25)
Average precipitation days (≥ 0.01 in)	6.6	6.5	9.1	10.5	11.6	9.0	8.0	7.4	7.0	8.6	7.3	6.5	98.1
Average snowy days (≥ 0.1 in)	2.1	1.5	0.4	0.0	0.0	0.0	0.0	0.0	0.0	0.0	0.2	1.4	5.6
Source: NOAA

== Education ==
California R-1 School District operates three schools in California and serves 1,357 students.

- California Elementary School, located at 101 South Owen Street, serves 586 students in Kindergarten through fifth grades.
- California Middle School, located at 211 South Owen Street, serves 298 students in sixth through eighth grades.
- California High School, located at 1501 West Buchanan Street, serves 472 students in ninth through twelfth grades.

The California R-1 School District is unique in that swimming is included in the K-5 curriculum. It is also a part of the physical education courses in the middle and high schools. Swimming has been a part of the curriculum since the school district constructed an indoor olympic-size swimming pool in 1976. In December 2007, due to funding cuts for public schools, the city of California took over control of the swimming pool. In an agreement worked out between the city and the school district, the school will continue to use the pool during the school year for the students of the California R-1 School District.

Aurora Montessori School serves pre-K and Kindergarten students.

The Diocese of Jefferson City operated a catholic school, Annunciation School, in California until the school was destroyed by fire in 1982.

There are seven post-secondary institutions located within 45 miles (72 km) of California.

== Transportation ==
=== Roads ===
California is served by U.S. Route 50 and Missouri Route 87.

=== Railroad ===
The Missouri River Runner Amtrak service runs through California but does not make stops in the city. The closest station to the east is in Jefferson City, while to the west the next station is in Sedalia.

== Industry ==
California is home to several industries and currently 40% of the jobs in town are in manufacturing. These include Burgers' Smokehouse, which cures and processes hams, turkeys, and other speciality meats for shipment all over the world; Honeysuckle White, a division of Cargill Inc., which produces poultry; Tana Wire Marker, which produces the brightly colored balls affixed to electrical wires to warn aircraft of their presence; Arkansas Valley Feather, which processes and markets feather products; Racker's Manufacturing (steel fabrication); Mo-Wood (cabinets and wood products); and California Manufacturing (coats and jackets).

== Historic places of interest ==
=== Cultural Heritage Center ===
Located at 201 North High Street in downtown California, the Cultural Heritage Center served as the old post office. Today, it houses the Moniteau County Historical Society, museum, information center, gift shop, and genealogical library.

=== Eitzen Mansion ===
Built in 1898 by Charles A. Eitzen, the Eitzen Mansion has 19 rooms and 9 fireplaces and includes the original slate roof. The carriage house and stable, with a room for the coachman, are still standing on the property, which takes up an entire city block. The home remained in the Eitzen family until 1952. Since then, it has been used as a nursing home, restaurant, and bed and breakfast successively. Through all of those changes, the original fireplaces, woodwork, and main staircase with its ornate woodwork remained intact. Today, the mansion serves as a private residence.

=== Finke Opera House/Ritz Theatre ===
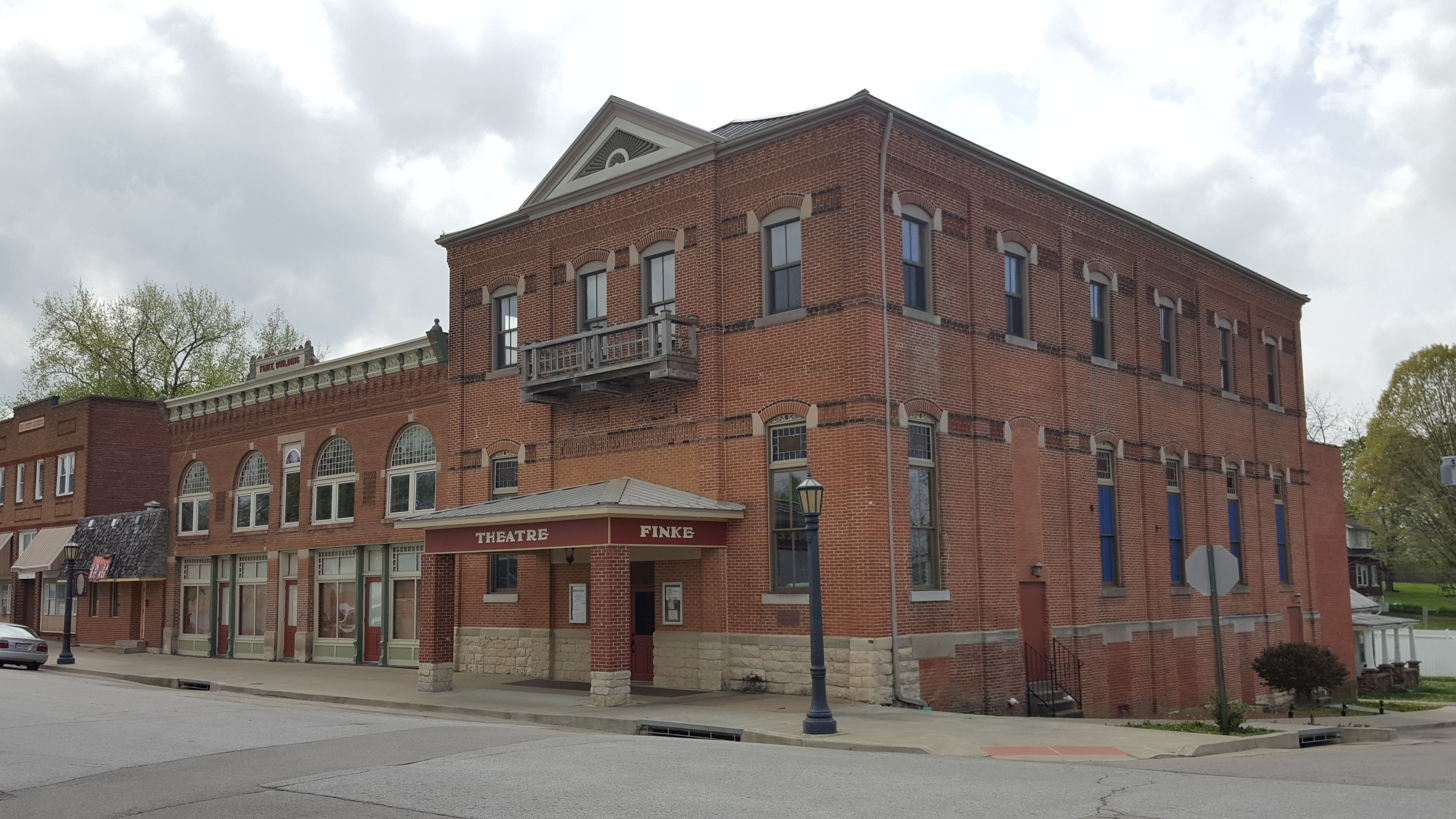
Finke Opera House as it appeared in 2017

Located at 312 North High Street in downtown California, the Finke Opera House/Ritz Theatre was built in 1885. The building was designed by Jerome Bibb "J.B." Legg, a well-known St. Louis architect. Legg was also responsible for designing many Missouri courthouses, opera houses, theaters, churches, schools, and public buildings, and he remodeled the Missouri State Capitol in 1887. The theater was named to the National Register of Historic Places for its significance in the area of entertainment and recreation in 2004.

The two-story brick building was California's only opera house and theater and therefore was the main entertainment center for the community. From 1885 to 1897, it was known as the California Opera House and then the Finke Opera House from 1897 to 1922. While it was the opera house, the building was home to stage shows, plays, musical and school performances. Blind Boone played the piano at the opera house in 1893. Cole Younger, an associate of Jesse James, lectured at the opera house in 1909. From 1922 to 1937, it was known as Finke Theater and featured vaudeville and motion pictures. In 1937, it was renovated from its Victorian style to an Art Deco style and became known as the Ritz Theatre, from 1937 to 1978. It has been known as the Finke Theater since the theater opened for the 2009–10 season on September 26, 2009.

The opera house/theatre was recently renovated by California Progress, Inc., along with the adjacent Finke Building, to save this historical landmark.

=== Gray-Wood Buildings ===
Located at 401-407 North High Street in downtown California, the Gray-Wood Buildings were added to the National Register of Historic Places in 1984 for their architectural significance. Built in 1869, they consist of a complex of four storefronts, constructed of brick with a stone foundation and a flat roof. Each building features differing design details including decorative cast metal columns and brick columns with vermiculated bases and caps.

=== Moniteau County Courthouse ===
Built in 1867, the Moniteau County Courthouse is one of the oldest courthouses in Missouri. The semicircular front portico and the square mounted abaci on top of the brick columns resemble those of the former State Capitol built in 1840. The courthouse square has been on the National Register of Historic Places since 1970. The first floor of the courthouse features several museum displays.

=== Rice House ===
The Rice House was built in 1867 by Niles Rice. This Victorian mansion has 12-foot (3.7 m) ceilings, six-foot hallways, and 36 narrow seven-foot windows. Just like the Eitzen Mansion, the Rice House also is currently a private residence.

=== Wood Place Public Library ===
Located in the historic Ehrhardt Building, the Wood Place Public Library was constructed in 1864 and was home to the J. G. Ehrhardt Mercantile Company. The building was purchased by California Progress, Inc. in 1995 and restored to preserve a historical landmark in the community. The library moved into the building in August 1998.

=== Old Barnhill Building ===
Built in 1892, the Old Barnhill Building is a two-story, Italianate style red brick historic commercial building. It measures 25 feet by 60 feet and has a flat roof and features cast iron embellishments. It was added to the National Register of Historic Places in 1982.

=== Old California City Hall and Fire Station ===
Built in 1892, Old California City Hall and Fire Station is a two-story, Italianate style red brick building that serves as a historic city hall and fire station. It has two one-story brick additions and features decorative brickwork at the roof line, arched window and door openings and an ornamental cast iron balcony.

It was added to the National Register of Historic Places in 1982.

== Arts and culture ==
Loran Creech, a watercolorist and Best of Missouri Hands juried artist, resides in California. His historic two-story home in California serves as his gallery. Creech's work has been featured in galleries all across the U.S.

The Finke Theatre hosts regular performances throughout the year.

The Cultural Heritage Center houses several wall murals depicting area history. California has a Community Band, which performs at several events around the community.

There is an art studio in downtown California with art classes and the California Parks and Recreation Department offers an art camp in the summer.

== Parks and recreation ==
The city of California maintains four parks, the California Sports Complex, and an indoor olympic-size swimming pool. The swimming pool was acquired from the California R-1 Public School District in 2007.

- Proctor Park is the largest park in California. This park features a stocked fishing lake, walking trails, tennis courts, disc golf course, sand volleyball court, shelter houses and playgrounds.
- City Park is the oldest park in California. It features basketball and tennis courts and a playground.
- Railroad Park is located just north of the City Hall along the Union Pacific Railroad. This park is located where the railroad depot was once located. The open-air shelter is a replica of the old depot.
- Smith-Burke Park, located just west of the City Hall, stands where the old Union Pacific Railroad Hotel once stood.
- The California Sports Complex features four lighted baseball/softball fields, a soccer field and sand volleyball court.
- The California Municipal Pool is an indoor olympic-sized swimming pool with an outdoor splash deck.

The city is also home to a semi-private nine-hole golf course, Double X Speedway (featuring street stocks, winged sprints, and hobby stocks races May–September), and the California Shooter's Club (which has shotgun and archery ranges).

California boasts a strong recreation program, serving children in the California area year-round. Also located in California are an airport (used for recreational flying), a 10-lane bowling alley, a roller rink, a dance studio, and some gyms.

== Events ==
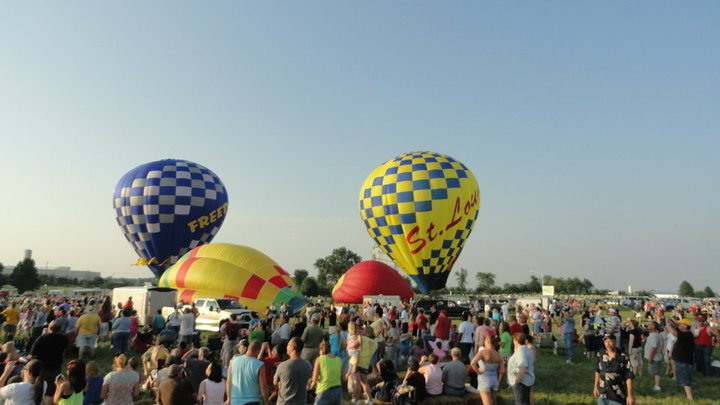
2011 California Balloon Invitational

In 2011, the Moniteau County Fair celebrated its 145th anniversary. The Fair began in 1866 and is believed to be the oldest continuous fair west of the Mississippi River. Events at the fair include the tractor pull, demolition derby, Tuff Truck competition, figure 8 race, horse show, battle of the bands, Miss Moniteau County Queen contest, baby show, and rodeo. This annual event is held during the first full week of August at the Moniteau County Fairgrounds. Referenced in Missouri Roadsides: The Traveler's Companion by Bill Earngey.

The Ozark Ham & Turkey festival, held annually on the third Saturday in September, is a one-day festival designed to showcase two of the major industries in both California and Moniteau County. Billed as having "something for everyone", this festival has activities throughout town.

A Cinco de Mayo Festival is held in downtown on the first Saturday of May. It features, food, crafts, entertainment and more. It celebrates California's large Hispanic population.

A Farmer's Market is held every Friday afternoon/evening from April to October near Smith-Burke Park.

The California Balloon Invitational is a hot air balloon race in California held on the third Saturday of July. Approximately 20 hot air balloons participate in a hare-and-hounds hot air balloon race.

Christmas California Style is held the first Friday and Saturday of December. Events include business open houses, a lighted Christmas parade, and more.

== In popular culture ==
Country singer-songwriter and California, Missouri native Kassi Ashton references the town in her song "California, Missouri".

== See also ==
- List of cities in Missouri
