= Moniteau County Courthouse Square =

Historic district in Missouri, United States

- U.S. National Register of Historic Places
- U.S. Historic district
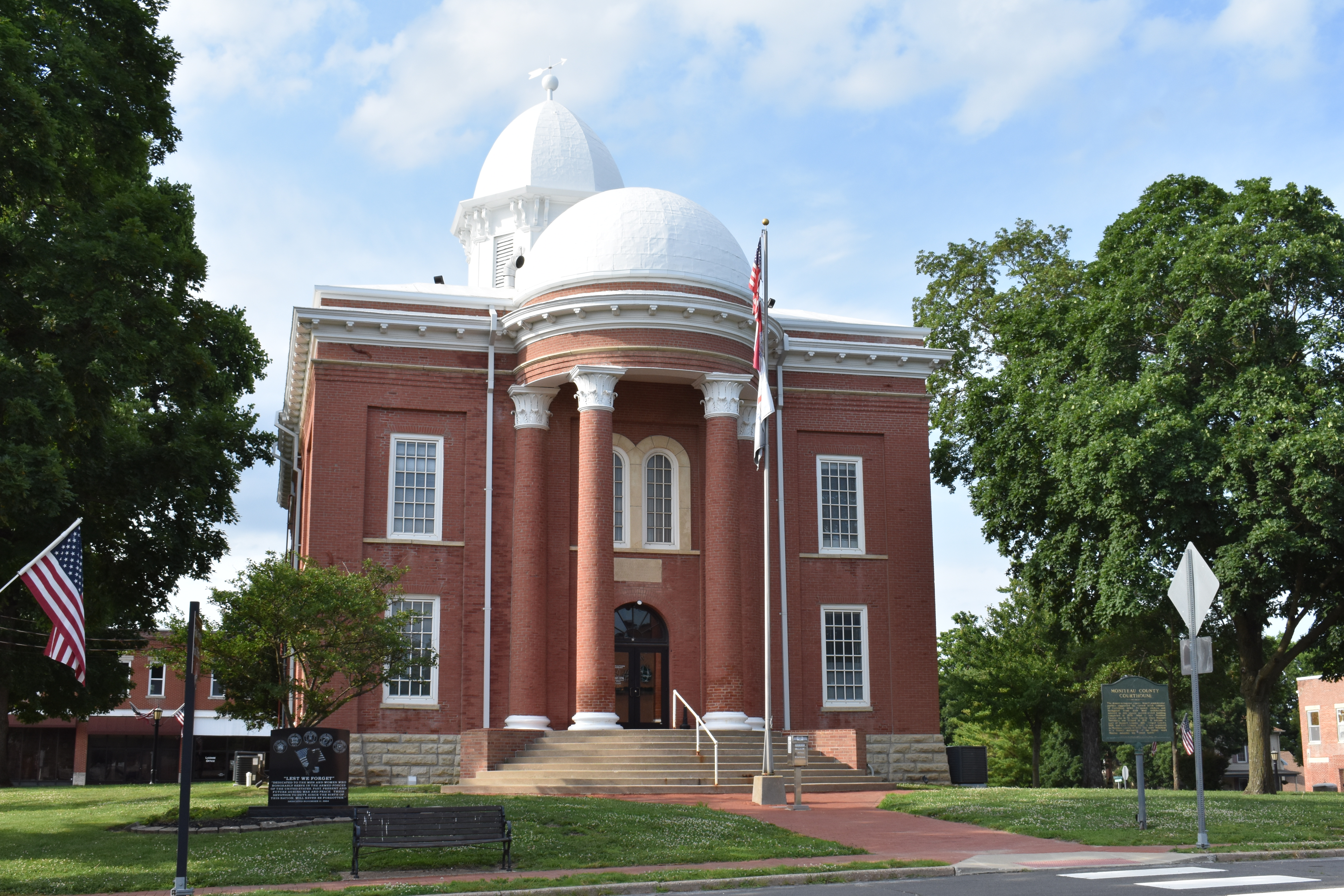
- Moniteau County Courthouse, June 2026

- Location within Missouri Location within the United States
- Location: Public Sq., California, Missouri
- Coordinates: 38°38′11″N 92°33′53″W
- Area: 6.3 acres (2.5 ha)
- Built: 1845
- Architect: Multiple
- Architectural style: Classic Revival
- NRHP reference No.: 70000341
- Added to NRHP: October 15, 1970

Moniteau County Courthouse Square is a national historic district located at California, Moniteau County, Missouri. The district encompasses 21 contributing buildings and 1 contributing site in the central business district of California. It developed between about 1867 and 1900, and includes representative examples of Classic Revival architecture. Contributing buildings include the Moniteau County Courthouse (1867-1868) and a variety of commercial buildings contemporary with the courthouse, dating from the mid to late-19th century.

It was listed on the National Register of Historic Places in 1970.
