= Cedron =

Cedron or Cedrón may refer to:

== Places ==
- Cedron, Brook of, or Kidron, near Jerusalem
- Cedron, Kansas
- Cedron, Missouri
- Cedron, Ohio

== People ==
- Alvaro Saavedra Cedrón, discoverer of Clipperton Island in 1528
- Andrea Cedrón (born 1993), Peruvian swimmer
- Carlos Cedron (born 1933), Peruvian sports shooter
- Miguel Ángel López-Cedrón (born 1978), Spanish footballer
- Pablo Cedrón (1958–2017), Argentine actor
- Rosa Cedrón (born 1972), Spanish Galician singer and cellist
- Víctor Cedrón (born 1993), Peruvian footballer

== Plants ==
- Aloysia citrodora, a culinary herb in the family Verbenaceae
- Simaba cedron, a medicinal plant in the family Simaroubaceae

== See also ==
- Kidron (disambiguation)
