= Clarksburg, Missouri =

- City
- Location in Moniteau County and the state of Missouri
- Coordinates: 38°39′40″N 92°39′58″W
- Country: United States
- State: Missouri
- County: Moniteau
- Founded: 1884
- Named for: Postmaster Hiram Clark

Area
  - Total: 0.58 sq mi (1.50 km^{2})
  - Land: 0.58 sq mi (1.49 km^{2})
  - Water: 0.0039 sq mi (0.01 km^{2})
- Elevation: 906 ft (276 m)

Population (2020)
  - Total: 254
  - Density: 440.2/sq mi (169.95/km^{2})
- Time zone: UTC-6 (Central (CST))
  - Summer (DST): UTC-5 (CDT)
- ZIP code: 65025
- Area code: 573
- FIPS code: 29-14140
- GNIS feature ID: 2393540

Clarksburg is a city in Moniteau County, Missouri, United States. The population was 254 at the 2020 census, down from 334 in 2010. It is part of the Jefferson City metropolitan area.

== History ==
A post office called Clarksburg has been in operation since 1884. Hiram Clark, an early postmaster, gave the town his last name.

== Geography ==
Clarksburg is in western Moniteau County, 6 miles (10 km) west-northwest of California, the county seat, and 7 miles (11 km) east-northeast of Tipton. It is 1 mile (1.6 km) north of U.S. Route 50 via Highway H.

According to the U.S. Census Bureau, Clarksburg has a total area of 0.58 square miles (1.50 km^{2}), of which 0.003 square miles (0.008 km^{2}), or 0.52%, are water. The city sits on high ground which drains north toward West Brush Creek, which itself flows northeast to Moniteau Creek and then the Missouri River; and south toward North Moreau Creek, which flows east to the Moreau River and then to the Missouri.

== Demographics ==
Historical population
| Census | Pop. | Note | %± |
|---|---|---|---|
| 1900 | 509 | | — |
| 1910 | 399 | | −21.6% |
| 1920 | 441 | | 10.5% |
| 1930 | 394 | | −10.7% |
| 1940 | 393 | | −0.3% |
| 1950 | 366 | | −6.9% |
| 1960 | 357 | | −2.5% |
| 1970 | 343 | | −3.9% |
| 1980 | 352 | | 2.6% |
| 1990 | 358 | | 1.7% |
| 2000 | 375 | | 4.7% |
| 2010 | 334 | | −10.9% |
| 2020 | 254 | | −24.0% |
U.S. Decennial Census

=== 2010 census ===
As of the census of 2010, there were 334 people, 115 households, and 89 families residing in the city. The population density was 575.9 inhabitants per square mile (222.4/km^{2}). There were 143 housing units at an average density of 246.6 per square mile (95.2/km^{2}). The racial makeup of the city was 97.9% White, 0.6% Native American, 0.6% from other races, and 0.9% from two or more races. Hispanic or Latino of any race were 1.8% of the population.

There were 115 households, of which 48.7% had children under the age of 18 living with them, 44.3% were married couples living together, 21.7% had a female householder with no husband present, 11.3% had a male householder with no wife present, and 22.6% were non-families. 15.7% of all households were made up of individuals, and 4.3% had someone living alone who was 65 years of age or older. The average household size was 2.90 and the average family size was 3.16.

The median age in the city was 31.7 years. 34.1% of residents were under the age of 18; 6.4% were between the ages of 18 and 24; 30.6% were from 25 to 44; 21.3% were from 45 to 64; and 7.8% were 65 years of age or older. The gender makeup of the city was 49.1% male and 50.9% female.

=== 2000 census ===
As of the census of 2000, there were 375 people, 129 households, and 81 families residing in the city. The population density was 649.9 inhabitants per square mile (250.9/km^{2}). There were 157 housing units at an average density of 272.1 per square mile (105.1/km^{2}). The racial makeup of the city was 100.00% White. Hispanic or Latino of any race were 4.27% of the population.

There were 129 households, out of which 41.1% had children under the age of 18 living with them, 45.0% were married couples living together, 14.0% had a female householder with no husband present, and 37.2% were non-families. 33.3% of all households were made up of individuals, and 13.2% had someone living alone who was 65 years of age or older. The average household size was 2.91 and the average family size was 3.78.

In the city the population was spread out, with 38.9% under the age of 18, 7.5% from 18 to 24, 30.1% from 25 to 44, 14.1% from 45 to 64, and 9.3% who were 65 years of age or older. The median age was 27 years. For every 100 females, there were 101.6 males. For every 100 females age 18 and over, there were 87.7 males.

The median income for a household in the city was $28,750, and the median income for a family was $37,292. Males had a median income of $25,000 versus $17,500 for females. The per capita income for the city was $11,903. About 3.8% of families and 8.3% of the population were below the poverty line, including 10.5% of those under age 18 and none of those age 65 or over.
