= Schaaf =

Schaaf is a surname. Notable people with the surname include:

- Alan Schaaf (born 1987), American businessman
- Bree Schaaf (born 1980), American skeleton racer
- David D. Schaaf (born 1939), American politician and businessman
- Ernie Schaaf (1908–1933), American boxer
- Harry Schaaf, American athlete
- Jim Schaaf, American football executive
- Joe Schaaf (1908–1997), American basketball player
- Johannes Schaaf (1933–2019), German film director, opera director, and actor
- Libby Schaaf (born 1965), American politician
- Robert Schaaf (born 1957), American physician
- Thomas Schaaf (born 1961), German professional football player

== See also ==
- Schaaf Creek, a stream in Cooper and Moniteau counties in Missouri
