= Bacon, Missouri =

Unincorporated community in the US state of Missouri

Coordinates: 38°42′31″N 92°27′13″W

Bacon is an unincorporated community in northeast Moniteau County, in the U.S. state of Missouri. The community is on Moniteau Creek approximately seven miles northeast of California.

== History ==
A post office called Bacon was established in 1890, and remained in operation until 1907. The community has the nickname of James "Bacon Jim" English, a local politician.
