= Tipton Times =

Newspaper in Missouri, U.S.

- Type: Weekly newspaper
- Owner: Vernon Publishing
- Founder: Abel Marcy
- Founded: 1877
- Headquarters: Tipton, Missouri, United States
- Circulation: 1,465
- ISSN: 2834-3395
- OCLC number: 21615166
- Website: vernonpublishing.com/Times/News

The Tipton Times is a weekly newspaper serving the city of Tipton, Missouri and Moniteau County. In 2018, the paper's circulation was 6,700.

== History ==
The newspaper was founded in 1877 by Abel Marcy. Marcy's sons and widow maintained the paper after his death in July 1884, and sold the paper to Walt M. Monroe in November 1885.

Twelve years later he sold the paper to his son Russell Monroe, and Joe H. Goddard. In 1901, Goddard obtained full ownership and ran the paper until his death in 1907. His wife Clara Goddard then sold the paper to Everett Pizer.

Upon his death in 1950, he was succeeded by his son E. N. “Norris” Pizer, who, in 1969, sold the paper to his daughter and son-in-law, Mary Jane and Tommy Miller. The couple operated the Tipton Times until selling in March 1984 to Vernon Publishing.
