= Assumption of the Blessed Virgin Mary Parish Historic District =

Historic church in Missouri, United States

- U.S. National Register of Historic Places
- U.S. Historic district
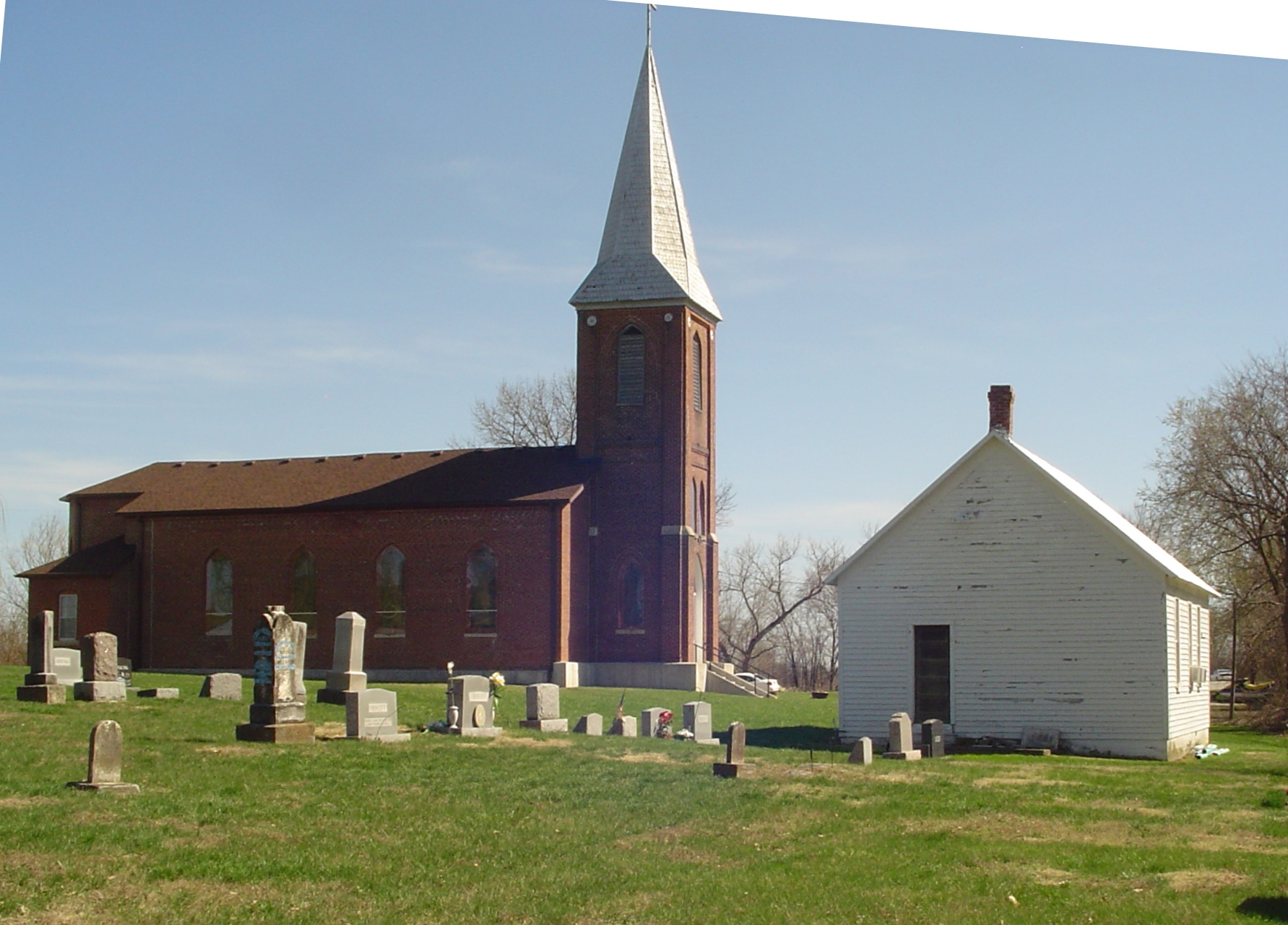

- Location within Missouri Location within the United States
- Location: NW. corner of jct. of Cedron Rd. & Zey Ln., near Jamestown, Missouri
- Coordinates: 38°46′25″N 92°34′15″W
- Area: 4.5 acres (1.8 ha)
- Built: 1841, 1867-1872, c. 1900, 1903, 1908
- Architect: Sprouce, O.E.
- MPS: Rural Church Architecture of Missouri, c. 1819 to c. 1945
- NRHP reference No.: 13001147
- Added to NRHP: February 5, 2014

Assumption of the Blessed Virgin Mary Parish Historic District, also known as Cedron Church and Assumption Catholic Church, is a historic Roman Catholic church complex and national historic district located at the Cedron settlement near Jamestown, Moniteau County, Missouri. The church was built between 1867 and 1872 and is a brick gable-end church. A three-tiered brick bell tower and sacristy were added in 1903. Also on the property are the contributing school (c. 1900), rectory (1908), privy, and cemetery. The cemetery contains approximately 285 graves with the earliest dating from November 1841.

It was listed on the National Register of Historic Places in 2014.
