= Maclay Mansion =

Historic house in Missouri, United States

- U.S. National Register of Historic Places
- Location within Missouri Location within the United States
- Location: 209 W. Howard St., Tipton, Missouri
- Coordinates: 38°39′35″N 92°46′54″W
- Area: 2.3 acres (0.93 ha)
- Built: c. 1858-1860
- NRHP reference No.: 79001383
- Added to NRHP: February 26, 1979

Maclay Mansion, also known as Rosehill Seminary and Gleim Mansion, is a historic home located at Tipton, Moniteau County, Missouri. It was built between about 1858 and 1860, and is a 2 1/2-story, five-bay, L-plan, orange-red brick dwelling. The main block measures approximately 45 feet by 36 feet and is topped by a gable roof. The house features a three-bay hip roofed front portico, massive end chimneys, a wide, bracketed cornice, and a two-story rear gallery.

It was added to the National Register of Historic Places in 1979.
