= Cedron, Missouri =

Unincorporated community in the US state of Missouri

Coordinates: 38°46′25″N 92°34′04″W

Cedron is an unincorporated community in northern Moniteau County, in the U.S. state of Missouri. The community was on a ridge above Schaaf Creek approximately 2.5 miles southeast of Prairie Home in adjacent Cooper County. It lies within the current Prairie Home Conservation Area.

== History ==
A post office called Cedron was established in 1896, and remained in operation until 1907. The name Cedron is derived from the Kidron Valley, in West Asia.
