= McGirk, Missouri =

Unincorporated community in the US state of Missouri

Coordinates: 38°36′40″N 92°28′35″W

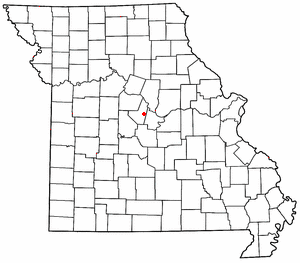

McGirk is an unincorporated community in eastern Moniteau County, Missouri, United States. It is located approximately five miles east of California on old U.S. Route 50.

A post office called McGirk has been in operation since 1881. The community has the name of the local McGirk family.
