= Edwin Q. White =

American journalist (1922–2012)

Edwin Quigley White (August 29, 1922 – November 1, 2012) was an American journalist who served as the Saigon bureau chief for the Associated Press from 1965 until 1975 during the height of the Vietnam War. Professionally, he was known as Quigley by colleagues. Those same colleagues also nicknamed him "unflappable Ed" for his calm demeanor in a crisis, particularly during his more than ten-year assignment covering the Vietnam War.

White was born on August 29, 1922, in Tipton, Missouri. He was interested in how Tipton's weekly newspaper was published as a child and decided to pursue journalism as a career. He received a bachelor's degree from the Missouri School of Journalism at the University of Missouri. He joined the United States Army during World War II. Once World War II ended, White and his unit were sent from the Philippines to Korea to help with the repatriation of Japanese troops from Korean Peninsula back to Japan. He also joined the staff of the Pacific Stars and Stripes, an Asian edition of the U.S. military newspaper, Stars and Stripes, while stationed in Asia during the postwar.

He then worked for five years at newspapers in both Kansas and Missouri after returning to the United States following World War II. One of his bosses recommended that he apply for a job at the Associated Press when he discussed his interest in reporting overseas. White joined the staff of the Associated Press' bureau in Kansas City in 1949. He then transferred to the AP's New York City office in 1954. He became the news editor for the Associated Press' Tokyo bureau, where the AP's Asian operations were headquartered, in 1960.

During the early 1960s, White had long-term assignments covering the growing conflict in Vietnam, which required him to commute between Tokyo and South Vietnam. In 1965, as the war between the United States and North Vietnam began to escalate, White was named the Associated Press' bureau chief in Saigon (now known as Ho Chi Minh City). Notable AP reporters who served at the Saigon bureau under White included photographer Horst Faas, foreign correspondent George Esper, and Roy Essoyan, who later became White's friend and neighbor in Hawaii. White's tenure as bureau chief ended with the fall of Saigon on April 30, 1975. White fled the city on one of the final helicopters to take off from the roof of the United States Embassy, Saigon.

White returned to the Tokyo bureau after the end of the Vietnam War. He moved to Hawaii in 1979, but transferred to the AP's Seoul bureau in 1980. He was sent to Seoul to help the AP's South Korean staff, who were dealing with increasing restriction on the media from the government of former president Chun Doo-hwan. He retired from the Associated Press in 1987 and moved to Hawaii.

White had been suffering from congestive heart failure during his later years. He died in his sleep at his home in Honolulu on November 1, 2012, at the age of 90. He had lived in Honolulu since his retirement in 1987. He was survived by his wife, Kim, who was originally from Vietnam; daughter, Rachel White Watanabe, and her husband, Michael Watanabe.

John Daniszewski, the current senior managing editor for international news at the Associated Press, praised White for his long career with the news agency, "Ed White led an extraordinary AP bureau that covered the American involvement in Vietnam from its start through the fall of Saigon in 1975...He embodied accuracy, dispassion and objectivity in his reporting, and his contribution to the telling of that history will never be forgotten by his colleagues".
