= Renfro, Missouri =

Unincorporated community in Missouri, U.S.

Coordinates: 38°51′41″N 92°30′27″W

Renfro is an unincorporated community in Moniteau County, in the U.S. state of Missouri.

== History ==
A post office called Renfro was established in 1899, and remained in operation until 1907. The community derives its name from James P. Renfrow, the proprietor of a local mill.
