= George Esper =

American journalist and academic

- Born: 1932; Uniontown, Pennsylvania, U.S.
- Died: February 2, 2012 (aged 79); Braintree, Massachusetts, U.S.
- Education: West Virginia University (BS)
- Occupation: Journalist
- Employer: Associated Press
- Relatives: Mark Esper (nephew)

George Esper (1932 – February 2, 2012) was an American journalist and academic known for his work as a foreign correspondent for the Associated Press during the Vietnam War.

== Early life and education ==
Esper was born in Uniontown, Pennsylvania, in 1932, the son of Lebanese immigrants. He graduated from West Virginia University, becoming the first member of his family to attend college.

== Career ==
Esper worked as a sports writer for the Uniontown Morning Herald and the Pittsburgh Press before being hired by the Associated Press in 1958. Esper was a noted foreign correspondent for the Associated Press during the Vietnam War, working at the AP's Saigon Bureau under bureau chief Edwin Q. White. Esper refused to leave the city, now known as Ho Chi Minh City, during the fall of Saigon, choosing to cover the aftermath of the end of the war. He spent forty-two years reporting for the Associated Press. He worked as a journalism professor at West Virginia University following his retirement from the AP in 2000.

== Personal life and death ==
Esper died in Braintree, Massachusetts, on February 2, 2012, at the age of 79. He was buried at St. George Maronite Catholic Church in Uniontown, Pennsylvania, on February 9.

His nephew is former secretary of defense Mark Esper.
