= Stella Weiner Kriegshaber =

American pianist

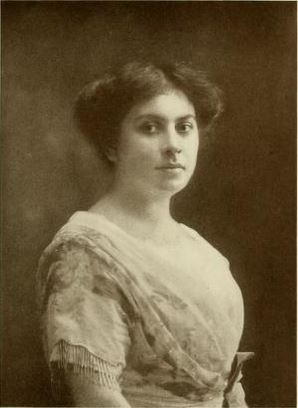
Stella Weiner Kriegshaber, Kajiwara Photo

Stella Weiner Kriegshaber (January 31, 1879 – April 3, 1966) was a noted American pianist.

== Biography ==
Stella Weiner was born in Tipton, Missouri, the daughter of Joseph Weiner, a druggist who owned the pharmacy on 28th and Washington Avenue, St Louis, for many years. When she was 7 years old, her family moved to St. Louis, where she began her music lessons with Mr. Eliling, under whose tuition she remained for seven years. Going through the grammar and high schools, she also took lessons on the organ during that time from him. At the age of eighteen this she studied for a year under A. Epstein, and a course of harmony for five seasons with Ernest Kroeger. She never went abroad to study, never gone away from St. Louis for any instruction in her musical education, believing that she could be guided in this development just as well by resident instructors as by those living abroad.

Stella Weiner made her first appearance in public at the age of nine years in St. Louis, at the piano store of P. G. Anton, the father of the violoncellist, P. G. Anton, Jr. On Monday and Wednesday evenings of each week the music store of Anton, then located at 308-10 North Broadway, St. Louis, and later at 11th and Olive Streets, was the gathering place for the men and women who were largely instrumental in putting St. Louis on the musical footing and giving it the prestige which later held in the musical world. Weiner accompanied by her mother and attended these Monday-night musicales, where she was recognized and encouraged for her unusual ability. At these Monday musicales at the Anton Store all were welcome who wished to take part and enjoyed music. Those who wanted to play were cordially received. There was much string music with piano accompaniment, trios, quartettes, quintettes, etc. Among those taking part prominently were Louis Hammerstein, G. Herrich, Ernst Spiering, Egmont Froelich, John Boehmen, Anna Graser Strothotte and her son, Maurice Arnold Strothotte; Robert Bernays, who later married a sister of the bandmaster, Sousa, and resided in Washington until his death; Frank Geeks, Sr. and Jr.; Mr. Ehling, Lena Anton, and others.

In 1901 she married David Kriegshaber, a native of Kentucky. He was engaged in the wholesale liquor business. They had two daughters: Edith K. Felsenthanl and Amy K. Lears.

Since its organization Kriegshaber was a member of the Tuesday Musical Club, which was the first piano club of any importance existing in St. Louis. Later the St. Louis Musical Club was organized. These two progressed for some time when they united under the name of the Union Musical, and under that flourished for several years, until it was changed again to the St. Louis Musical Club, of which Kriegshaber was the president. One of the objects of the organization was to encourage and aid amateur musicians, and assist them in developing talent that might lead them to a successful career. Once or twice each year they brought artists to give concerts and for many years the incomparable Kneisel Quartet performed in St. Louis under their auspices. Once a month the club held its meeting in the Musical Arts Building. Mrs. Paul Tupper and Mrs. George Frankel each held the office of the presidency.

Kriegshaber rendered selections for the popular concerts given by the Symphony Society, and for the Morning Choral. In 1912, she played with the Morning Choral orchestra, but before that her programme consisted only of solos. She also gave numbers for the Union Club, and for Ernest Kroeger's recitals; in 1912 the lectures were on Tristan and Isolde. In 1913 an explanation of Wagner's opera, Die Walkiire, which was played as duos on two pianos to illustrate the various motifs. This opera musicale was given for the benefit of the Smith College Club Fund, which was to be used in endowing chairs in the departments of the college work at the institution.

Kriegshaber was the organist for the King's Highway Presbyterian Church. One summer she acted as substitute at St. John's Church. She also gave private lessons at her home. In the Ladies' Friday Musical Club she took a very active part. The meetings took place, as the name indicates, on Friday of each week at the home of someone of the members. The membership was composed almost entirely of Jewish women. The club was organized in 1884 and was always successfully conducted, numbering among its members many of the best musicians of St. Louis. The charter members of the Friday club were Mrs. Louis Hirsch, Mrs. J. P. Weil, Mrs. Adolph Drey and Mrs. Joseph Glaser. The club numbered about twenty-five members, and their work showed the skill of professionals. In 1938 Kriegshaber was included in Who's Who in American Jewry. In 1962, at 83 years old, Kriegshaber participated to the Friday Musical Club 80 years celebrations.

In 1916, she performed the Piano Concerto in A minor, Op. 15 by Edward MacDowell, as soloist with the St. Louis Symphony Orchestra at the University Auditorium, conductor Max Zach.

She died on April 3, 1966.
