= Jamestown, Missouri =

- Town
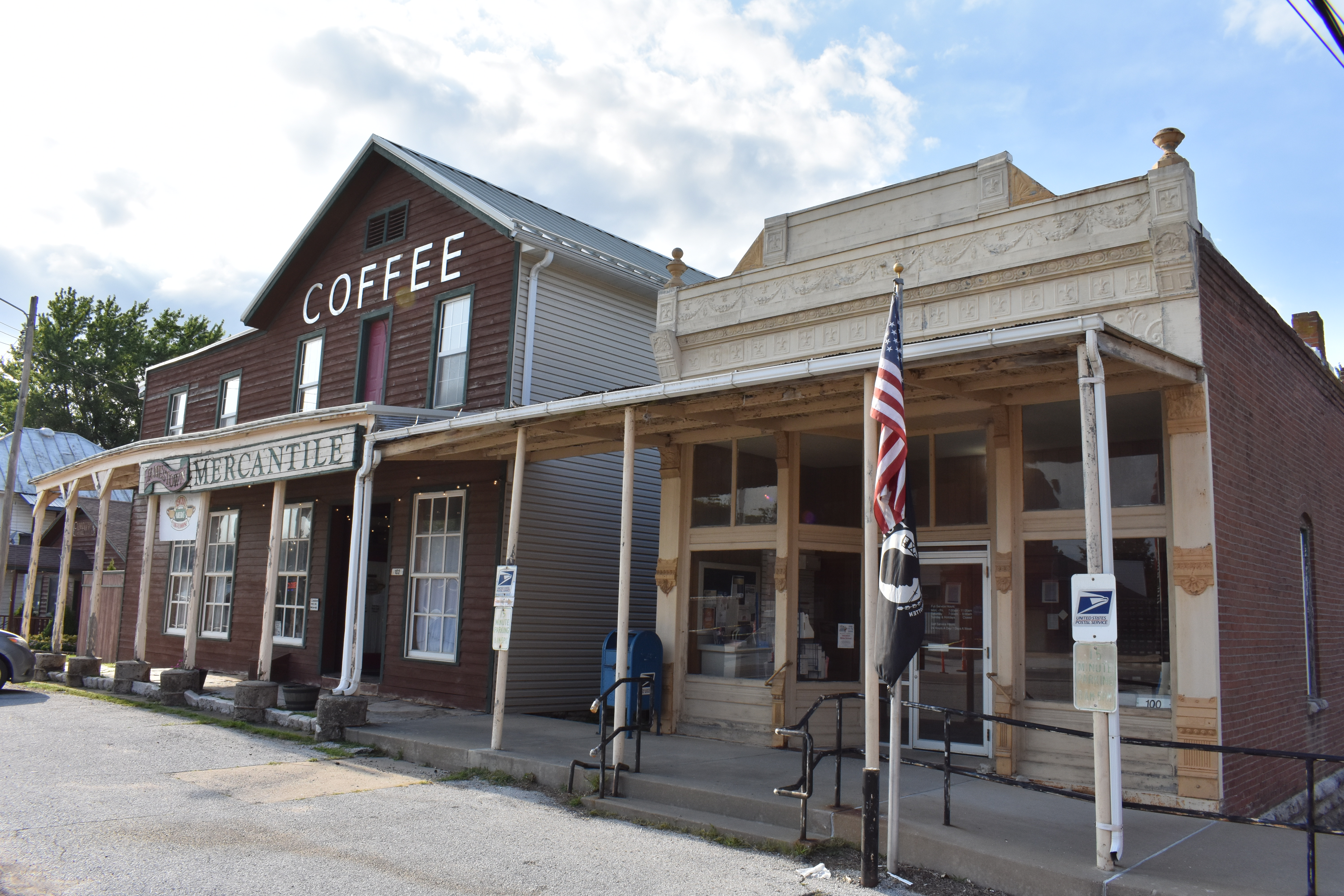
- Jamestown in June 2026

- Location in Moniteau County and the state of Missouri
- Coordinates: 38°46′00″N 92°28′49″W
- Country: United States
- State: Missouri
- County: Moniteau
- Founded: 1846
- Incorporated: 1850
- Named after: E.H. and S.L. James

Area
  - Total: 1.01 sq mi (2.61 km^{2})
  - Land: 1.00 sq mi (2.59 km^{2})
  - Water: 0.0077 sq mi (0.02 km^{2})
- Elevation: 869 ft (265 m)

Population (2020)
  - Total: 330
  - Density: 330.2/sq mi (127.48/km^{2})
- Time zone: UTC-6 (Central (CST))
  - Summer (DST): UTC-5 (CDT)
- ZIP code: 65046
- Area code: 660
- FIPS code: 29-36368
- GNIS feature ID: 2397011

Jamestown is a village in northeastern Moniteau County, Missouri, United States. The population was 330 at the 2020 census, down from 386 in 2010. It is part of the Jefferson City metropolitan area.

== History ==
Jamestown had its start in 1846 when E. H. and S. L. James established a country store at that point. A post office called Jamestown has been in operation since 1850.

The Assumption of the Blessed Virgin Mary Parish Historic District and Dick-Kobel Homestead are listed on the National Register of Historic Places in Jamestown.

== Geography ==
The village is located on Missouri Route 87, approximately 12 miles (19 km) northeast of California, the county seat. Sandy Hook, on the Missouri River, is 4 miles (6 km) east on Missouri Route 179.

According to the U.S. Census Bureau, Jamestown has a total area of 1.01 square miles (2.62 km^{2}), of which 0.01 square miles (0.03 km^{2}), or 0.70%, are water. The village sits on a ridge which drains north toward Factory Creek, southeast into Haldiman Branch, and southwest into Hauck Branch. Factory Creek is an east-flowing direct tributary of the Missouri River, while the two branches flow southeast to Moniteau Creek, also a tributary of the Missouri.

== Demographics ==
Historical population
Census	Pop.	Note	%±
1880	185		—
1890	313		69.2%
1900	344		9.9%
1910	305		−11.3%
1920	264		−13.4%
1930	273		3.4%
1940	269		−1.5%
1950	245		−8.9%
1960	216		−11.8%
1970	243		12.5%
1980	317		30.5%
1990	298		−6.0%
2000	382		28.2%
2010	386		1.0%
2020	330		−14.5%
U.S. Decennial Census

=== 2010 census ===
As of the census of 2010, there were 386 people, 161 households, and 100 families residing in the village. The population density was 386.0 inhabitants per square mile (149.0/km^{2}). There were 187 housing units at an average density of 187.0 per square mile (72.2/km^{2}). The racial makeup of the village was 97.9% White and 2.1% from two or more races. Hispanic or Latino of any race were 1.0% of the population.

There were 161 households, of which 34.2% had children under the age of 18 living with them, 48.4% were married couples living together, 11.2% had a female householder with no husband present, 2.5% had a male householder with no wife present, and 37.9% were non-families. 36.6% of all households were made up of individuals, and 18.6% had someone living alone who was 65 years of age or older. The average household size was 2.40 and the average family size was 3.16.

The median age in the village was 36.6 years. 28.5% of residents were under the age of 18; 5.7% were between the ages of 18 and 24; 24.3% were from 25 to 44; 22% were from 45 to 64; and 19.4% were 65 years of age or older. The gender makeup of the village was 49.2% male and 50.8% female.

=== 2000 census ===
As of the census of 2000, there were 382 people, 175 households, and 103 families residing in the town. The population density was 381.2 inhabitants per square mile (147.2/km^{2}). There were 191 housing units at an average density of 190.6 per square mile (73.6/km^{2}). The racial makeup of the town was 97.12% White, 0.79% Native American, 0.26% Asian, 0.26% Pacific Islander, and 1.57% from two or more races. Hispanic or Latino of any race were 0.52% of the population.

There were 175 households, out of which 27.4% had children under the age of 18 living with them, 44.6% were married couples living together, 9.7% had a female householder with no husband present, and 40.6% were non-families. 36.0% of all households were made up of individuals, and 16.0% had someone living alone who was 65 years of age or older. The average household size was 2.18 and the average family size was 2.81.

In the town the population was spread out, with 23.0% under the age of 18, 8.9% from 18 to 24, 27.0% from 25 to 44, 24.3% from 45 to 64, and 16.8% who were 65 years of age or older. The median age was 38 years. For every 100 females, there were 94.9 males. For every 100 females age 18 and over, there were 86.1 males.

The median income for a household in the town was $31,667, and the median income for a family was $41,389. Males had a median income of $27,917 versus $20,461 for females. The per capita income for the town was $16,498. About 3.7% of families and 8.1% of the population were below the poverty line, including 10.6% of those under age 18 and 9.8% of those age 65 or over.

== Education ==
There is one high school in Jamestown, Jamestown C-1 High School.
