= 1948 United States presidential election in Missouri =

- November 2, 1948

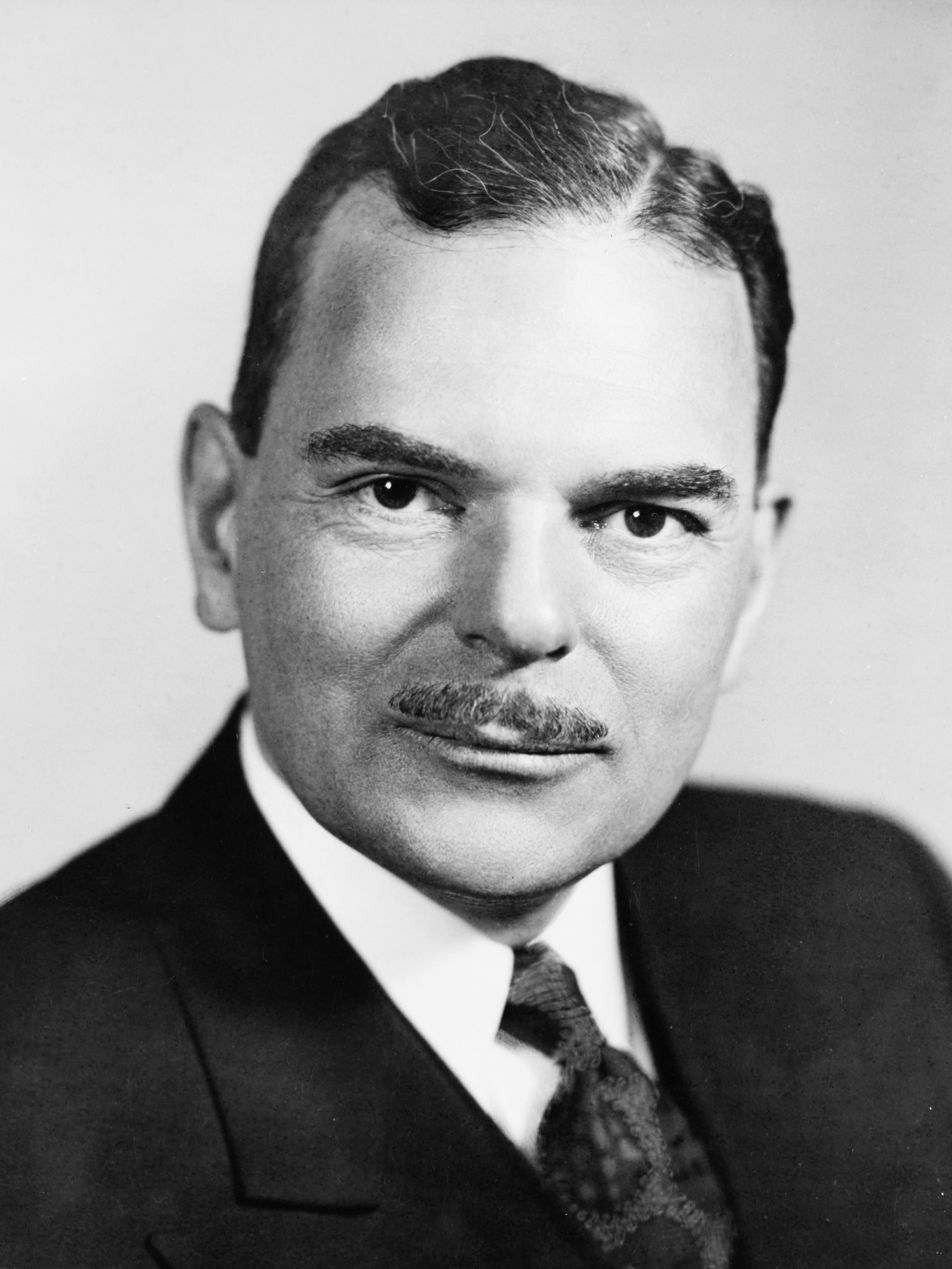
Nominee	Harry S. Truman	Thomas E. Dewey
Party	Democratic	Republican
Home state	Missouri	New York
Running mate	Alben W. Barkley	Earl Warren
Electoral vote	15	0
Popular vote	917,315	655,039
Percentage	58.11%	41.49%
County results
Truman
50–60%
60–70%
70–80%
80–90%
Dewey
50–60%
60–70%
70–80%
President before election
Harry S. Truman
Democratic
Elected President
Harry S. Truman
Democratic

The 1948 United States presidential election in Missouri took place on November 2, 1948, as part of the 1948 United States presidential election. Voters chose 15 representatives, or electors, to the Electoral College, who voted for president and vice president.

Incumbent President Harry S. Truman won his home state of Missouri with 58.11% of the popular vote against Republican Governor of New York Thomas E. Dewey, who gained 41.49% of the popular vote. As of the 2024 presidential election, this is the last election in which Moniteau and Cole Counties voted for a Democratic presidential candidate. Truman dramatically improved upon Franklin D. Roosevelt's performance in the state four years prior, winning the state by more than 16 percentage points, compared to Roosevelt's 3 percentage points.

== Results ==
1948 United States presidential election in Missouri
Party	Candidate	Votes	%
Democratic	Harry S. Truman (inc.)	917,315	58.11%
Republican	Thomas E. Dewey	655,039	41.49%
Progressive	Henry A. Wallace	3,998	0.25%
Socialist	Norman Thomas	2,222	0.14%
Write-in	Strom Thurmond	42 (Note: These write-in votes were not separated by county, although different write-in candidates were separated in the statewide total.)	0.00%
Write-in	Claude A. Watson	8	0.00%
Write-in	Edward A. Teichert	3	0.00%
Write-in	—	1	0.00%
Total votes		1,578,628	100%

=== Results by county ===
County	Harry S. Truman Democratic		Thomas E. Dewey Republican		Henry A. Wallace Progressive		Norman Thomas Socialist		Margin		Total votes cast
County	#	%	#	%	#	%	#	%	#	%	Total votes cast
Adair	4,136	50.43%	4,024	49.07%	33	0.40%	8	0.10%	112	1.36%	8,201
Andrew	2,576	44.96%	3,142	54.84%	9	0.16%	2	0.03%	-566	-9.88%	5,729
Atchison	2,498	53.23%	2,190	46.67%	2	0.04%	3	0.06%	308	6.56%	4,693
Audrain	7,495	73.12%	2,739	26.72%	13	0.13%	3	0.03%	4,756	46.40%	10,250
Barry	4,724	49.54%	4,812	50.46%	0	0.00%	0	0.00%	-88	-0.92%	9,536
Barton	3,008	53.79%	2,577	46.08%	6	0.11%	1	0.02%	431	7.71%	5,592
Bates	4,371	51.22%	4,156	48.71%	4	0.05%	2	0.02%	215	2.51%	8,533
Benton	1,360	32.92%	2,768	67.01%	2	0.05%	1	0.02%	-1,408	-34.09%	4,131
Bollinger	2,075	48.63%	2,187	51.25%	3	0.07%	2	0.05%	-112	-2.62%	4,267
Boone	10,200	69.61%	4,289	29.27%	81	0.55%	83	0.57%	5,911	40.34%	14,653
Buchanan	22,975	63.76%	13,002	36.08%	31	0.09%	26	0.07%	9,973	27.68%	36,034
Butler	5,319	55.23%	4,276	44.40%	24	0.25%	11	0.11%	1,043	10.83%	9,630
Caldwell	1,985	42.45%	2,687	57.46%	3	0.06%	1	0.02%	-702	-15.01%	4,676
Callaway	6,215	71.78%	2,433	28.10%	6	0.07%	4	0.05%	3,782	43.68%	8,658
Camden	1,264	38.41%	2,020	61.38%	3	0.09%	4	0.12%	-756	-22.97%	3,291
Cape Girardeau	7,872	52.58%	7,084	47.32%	8	0.05%	7	0.05%	788	5.26%	14,971
Carroll	3,401	44.64%	4,212	55.29%	5	0.07%	0	0.00%	-811	-10.65%	7,618
Carter	1,255	56.10%	964	43.09%	13	0.58%	5	0.22%	291	13.01%	2,237
Cass	5,415	59.87%	3,614	39.96%	12	0.13%	4	0.04%	1,801	19.91%	9,045
Cedar	2,062	41.24%	2,928	58.56%	4	0.08%	6	0.12%	-866	-17.32%	5,000
Chariton	4,170	61.40%	2,615	38.51%	3	0.04%	3	0.04%	1,555	22.89%	6,791
Christian	1,600	33.79%	3,129	66.08%	3	0.06%	3	0.06%	-1,529	-32.29%	4,735
Clark	2,352	50.92%	2,264	49.01%	1	0.02%	2	0.04%	88	1.91%	4,619
Clay	11,855	64.77%	6,408	35.01%	21	0.11%	20	0.11%	5,447	29.76%	18,304
Clinton	3,481	60.91%	2,227	38.97%	3	0.05%	4	0.07%	1,254	21.94%	5,715
Cole	7,891	53.23%	6,909	46.60%	14	0.09%	11	0.07%	982	6.63%	14,825
Cooper	3,865	48.51%	4,094	51.38%	1	0.01%	8	0.10%	-229	-2.87%	7,968
Crawford	2,289	46.25%	2,650	53.55%	7	0.14%	3	0.06%	-361	-7.30%	4,949
Dade	1,733	38.33%	2,783	61.56%	1	0.02%	4	0.09%	-1,050	-23.23%	4,521
Dallas	1,590	37.01%	2,695	62.73%	6	0.14%	5	0.12%	-1,105	-25.72%	4,296
Daviess	2,868	50.38%	2,823	49.59%	1	0.02%	1	0.02%	45	0.79%	5,693
DeKalb	2,033	49.17%	2,098	50.74%	2	0.05%	2	0.05%	-65	-1.57%	4,135
Dent	2,973	59.58%	2,003	40.14%	9	0.18%	5	0.10%	970	19.44%	4,990
Douglas	1,163	29.71%	2,734	69.85%	7	0.18%	10	0.26%	-1,571	-40.14%	3,914
Dunklin	10,979	81.56%	2,466	18.32%	8	0.06%	8	0.06%	8,513	63.24%	13,461
Franklin	7,822	50.19%	7,725	49.57%	28	0.18%	10	0.06%	97	0.62%	15,585
Gasconade	1,204	21.95%	4,268	77.81%	10	0.18%	3	0.05%	-3,064	-55.86%	5,485
Gentry	3,410	56.42%	2,633	43.56%	0	0.00%	1	0.02%	777	12.86%	6,044
Greene	20,762	52.34%	18,836	47.49%	32	0.08%	34	0.09%	1,926	4.85%	39,664
Grundy	3,177	48.79%	3,331	51.15%	0	0.00%	4	0.06%	-154	-2.36%	6,512
Harrison	2,854	43.82%	3,646	55.98%	5	0.08%	8	0.12%	-792	-12.16%	6,513
Henry	5,551	54.56%	4,619	45.40%	1	0.01%	3	0.03%	932	9.16%	10,174
Hickory	733	29.77%	1,728	70.19%	0	0.00%	1	0.04%	-995	-40.42%	2,462
Holt	2,040	43.86%	2,607	56.05%	2	0.04%	2	0.04%	-567	-12.19%	4,651
Howard	4,143	72.77%	1,538	27.02%	7	0.12%	5	0.09%	2,605	45.75%	5,693
Howell	3,599	44.65%	4,427	54.93%	13	0.16%	21	0.26%	-828	-10.28%	8,060
Iron	2,552	63.90%	1,435	35.93%	3	0.08%	4	0.10%	1,117	27.97%	3,994
Jackson	139,186	61.44%	86,471	38.17%	634	0.28%	236	0.10%	52,715	23.27%	226,527
Jasper	15,404	51.21%	14,593	48.52%	58	0.19%	23	0.08%	811	2.69%	30,078
Jefferson	10,280	62.55%	6,085	37.02%	47	0.29%	23	0.14%	4,195	25.53%	16,435
Johnson	4,888	49.85%	4,903	50.01%	8	0.08%	6	0.06%	-15	-0.16%	9,805
Knox	2,268	58.32%	1,620	41.66%	0	0.00%	1	0.03%	648	16.66%	3,889
Laclede	3,221	45.92%	3,773	53.78%	9	0.13%	12	0.17%	-552	-7.86%	7,015
Lafayette	5,988	47.37%	6,634	52.48%	11	0.09%	9	0.07%	-646	-5.11%	12,642
Lawrence	4,649	46.22%	5,392	53.61%	10	0.10%	7	0.07%	-743	-7.39%	10,058
Lewis	3,155	66.69%	1,564	33.06%	6	0.13%	6	0.13%	1,591	33.63%	4,731
Lincoln	4,190	66.13%	2,135	33.70%	5	0.08%	6	0.09%	2,055	32.43%	6,336
Linn	5,788	58.86%	4,034	41.03%	5	0.05%	6	0.06%	1,754	17.83%	9,833
Livingston	4,182	52.07%	3,835	47.75%	6	0.07%	8	0.10%	347	4.32%	8,031
Macon	5,193	57.45%	3,833	42.41%	6	0.07%	7	0.08%	1,360	15.04%	9,039
Madison	2,509	54.56%	2,086	45.36%	1	0.02%	3	0.07%	423	9.20%	4,599
Maries	1,948	68.45%	894	31.41%	1	0.04%	3	0.11%	1,054	37.04%	2,846
Marion	9,122	70.47%	3,802	29.37%	14	0.11%	6	0.05%	5,320	41.10%	12,944
McDonald	2,925	49.45%	2,979	50.36%	8	0.14%	3	0.05%	-54	-0.91%	5,915
Mercer	1,008	38.69%	1,595	61.23%	1	0.04%	1	0.04%	-587	-22.54%	2,605
Miller	2,514	44.80%	3,088	55.03%	4	0.07%	5	0.09%	-574	-10.23%	5,611
Mississippi	4,592	77.63%	1,293	21.86%	25	0.42%	5	0.08%	3,299	55.77%	5,915
Moniteau	2,787	51.75%	2,594	48.17%	1	0.02%	3	0.06%	193	3.58%	5,385
Monroe	4,769	85.39%	809	14.49%	6	0.11%	1	0.02%	3,960	70.90%	5,585
Montgomery	2,792	49.04%	2,889	50.75%	3	0.05%	9	0.16%	-97	-1.71%	5,693
Morgan	1,862	43.94%	2,365	55.80%	4	0.09%	7	0.17%	-503	-11.86%	4,238
New Madrid	8,925	81.00%	2,082	18.90%	6	0.05%	5	0.05%	6,843	62.10%	11,018
Newton	5,598	48.92%	5,820	50.86%	15	0.13%	10	0.09%	-222	-1.94%	11,443
Nodaway	6,253	56.03%	4,886	43.78%	13	0.12%	9	0.08%	1,367	12.25%	11,161
Oregon	3,133	71.91%	1,214	27.86%	4	0.09%	6	0.14%	1,919	44.05%	4,357
Osage	2,672	51.68%	2,488	48.12%	4	0.08%	6	0.12%	184	3.56%	5,170
Ozark	859	30.33%	1,967	69.46%	2	0.07%	4	0.14%	-1,108	-39.13%	2,832
Pemiscot	10,269	81.98%	2,249	17.95%	1	0.01%	7	0.06%	8,020	64.03%	12,526
Perry	2,133	42.30%	2,903	57.56%	1	0.02%	6	0.12%	-770	-15.26%	5,043
Pettis	8,388	55.66%	6,657	44.18%	16	0.11%	8	0.05%	1,731	11.48%	15,069
Phelps	5,202	62.85%	3,053	36.89%	15	0.18%	7	0.08%	2,149	25.96%	8,277
Pike	4,934	66.68%	2,448	33.08%	7	0.09%	11	0.15%	2,486	33.60%	7,400
Platte	4,354	72.40%	1,644	27.34%	6	0.10%	10	0.17%	2,710	45.06%	6,014
Polk	3,079	43.32%	4,026	56.65%	1	0.01%	1	0.01%	-947	-13.33%	7,107
Pulaski	2,858	63.33%	1,644	36.43%	8	0.18%	3	0.07%	1,214	26.90%	4,513
Putnam	1,463	36.79%	2,499	62.84%	8	0.20%	7	0.18%	-1,036	-26.05%	3,977
Ralls	3,013	76.82%	908	23.15%	0	0.00%	1	0.03%	2,105	53.67%	3,922
Randolph	7,912	77.74%	2,256	22.17%	7	0.07%	3	0.03%	5,656	55.57%	10,178
Ray	4,826	69.57%	2,102	30.30%	4	0.06%	5	0.07%	2,724	39.27%	6,937
Reynolds	2,050	74.60%	692	25.18%	4	0.15%	2	0.07%	1,358	49.42%	2,748
Ripley	2,304	59.72%	1,533	39.74%	16	0.41%	5	0.13%	771	19.98%	3,858
St. Charles	6,049	50.14%	5,976	49.54%	23	0.19%	16	0.13%	73	0.60%	12,064
St. Clair	2,489	49.35%	2,548	50.52%	5	0.10%	2	0.04%	-59	-1.17%	5,044
St. Francois	7,276	53.73%	6,234	46.03%	23	0.17%	9	0.07%	1,042	7.70%	13,542
St. Louis	62,684	47.00%	69,592	52.17%	700	0.52%	407	0.31%	-6,908	-5.17%	133,383
St. Louis City	220,654	64.19%	120,656	35.10%	1638	0.48%	822	0.24%	99,998	29.09%	343,770
Ste. Genevieve	1,984	55.61%	1,567	43.92%	12	0.34%	5	0.14%	417	11.69%	3,568
Saline	7,185	59.73%	4,822	40.09%	13	0.11%	9	0.07%	2,363	19.64%	12,029
Schuyler	1,892	57.74%	1,377	42.02%	2	0.06%	6	0.18%	515	15.72%	3,277
Scotland	2,451	59.02%	1,693	40.77%	8	0.19%	1	0.02%	758	18.25%	4,153
Scott	8,266	76.52%	2,519	23.32%	8	0.07%	10	0.09%	5,747	53.20%	10,803
Shannon	2,352	74.10%	805	25.36%	8	0.25%	9	0.28%	1,547	48.74%	3,174
Shelby	3,400	71.43%	1,348	28.32%	11	0.23%	1	0.02%	2,052	43.11%	4,760
Stoddard	7,029	69.12%	3,117	30.65%	17	0.17%	6	0.06%	3,912	38.47%	10,169
Stone	892	28.58%	2,222	71.20%	5	0.16%	2	0.06%	-1,330	-42.62%	3,121
Sullivan	3,443	52.23%	3,140	47.63%	5	0.08%	4	0.06%	303	4.60%	6,592
Taney	1,427	37.58%	2,361	62.18%	6	0.16%	3	0.08%	-934	-24.60%	3,797
Texas	4,664	58.34%	3,320	41.53%	6	0.08%	4	0.05%	1,344	16.81%	7,994
Vernon	5,342	58.29%	3,808	41.55%	9	0.10%	5	0.05%	1,534	16.74%	9,164
Warren	1,071	30.88%	2,380	68.63%	7	0.20%	10	0.29%	-1,309	-37.75%	3,468
Washington	2,370	51.69%	2,200	47.98%	9	0.20%	6	0.13%	170	3.71%	4,585
Wayne	2,695	58.16%	1,937	41.80%	1	0.02%	1	0.02%	758	16.36%	4,634
Webster	3,292	47.78%	3,581	51.97%	9	0.13%	8	0.12%	-289	-4.19%	6,890
Worth	1,563	57.21%	1,162	42.53%	4	0.15%	3	0.11%	401	14.68%	2,732
Wright	2,505	41.35%	3,542	58.47%	8	0.13%	3	0.05%	-1,037	-17.12%	6,058
Totals	917,315	58.11%	655,039	41.49%	3,998	0.25%	2,222	0.14%	262,276	16.62%	1,578,628

==== Counties that flipped from Republican to Democratic ====
- Adair
- Atchison
- Barton
- Bates
- Butler
- Cape Girardeau
- Cass
- Clark
- Cole
- Daviess
- Franklin
- Greene
- Henry
- Jasper
- Knox
- Livingston
- Macon
- Madison
- Moniteau
- Nodaway
- Osage
- Pettis
- St. Charles
- St. Francois
- Ste. Genevieve
- Sullivan
- Vernon
- Washington
- Wayne
- Worth

== See also ==
- United States presidential elections in Missouri
