= Prairie Home, Missouri =

- City
- Location of Prairie Home, Missouri
- Coordinates: 38°48′49″N 92°35′26″W
- Country: United States
- State: Missouri
- County: Cooper

Area
  - Total: 0.39 sq mi (1.00 km^{2})
  - Land: 0.39 sq mi (1.00 km^{2})
  - Water: 0 sq mi (0.00 km^{2})
- Elevation: 892 ft (272 m)

Population (2020)
  - Total: 262
  - Density: 675.8/sq mi (260.93/km^{2})
- Time zone: UTC-6 (Central (CST))
  - Summer (DST): UTC-5 (CDT)
- ZIP code: 65068
- Area code: 660
- FIPS code: 29-59726
- GNIS feature ID: 2396267
- Website: cityprairiehome.com

Prairie Home is a city, in Cooper County, Missouri, United States. As of the 2020 census, Prairie Home had a population of 262.

== History ==
The town of Prairie Home was laid out in 1874 around the Prairie Home Institute, a school that had been built some time earlier. Prairie Home is a descriptive name, referring to its scenic setting on the prairie.

== Geography ==
Prairie Home is located along Missouri Route 87 at its intersection with routes J and EE. The community is 1.5 miles west of the Cooper-Moniteau county line and approximately 13 miles southeast of Boonville. The Prairie Home Conservation Area is two miles south along Schaaf Creek.

According to the United States Census Bureau, the city has a total area of 0.39 square miles (1.01 km^{2}), all land.

== Demographics ==
Historical population
Census	Pop.	Note	%±
1880	43		—
1900	196		—
1910	184		−6.1%
1920	192		4.3%
1930	151		−21.4%
1940	251		66.2%
1950	208		−17.1%
1960	213		2.4%
1970	231		8.5%
1980	279		20.8%
1990	215		−22.9%
2000	220		2.3%
2010	280		27.3%
2020	262		−6.4%
U.S. Decennial Census

=== 2010 census ===
As of the census of 2010, there were 280 people, 121 households, and 85 families living in the city. The population density was 717.9 inhabitants per square mile (277.2/km^{2}). There were 132 housing units at an average density of 338.5 per square mile (130.7/km^{2}). The racial makeup of the city was 98.9% White, 0.4% African American, 0.4% Asian, and 0.4% from two or more races. Hispanic or Latino of any race were 0.7% of the population.

There were 121 households, of which 31.4% had children under the age of 18 living with them, 55.4% were married couples living together, 10.7% had a female householder with no husband present, 4.1% had a male householder with no wife present, and 29.8% were non-families. 27.3% of all households were made up of individuals, and 18.2% had someone living alone who was 65 years of age or older. The average household size was 2.31 and the average family size was 2.78.

The median age in the city was 42.7 years. 22.1% of residents were under the age of 18; 5.4% were between the ages of 18 and 24; 27.4% were from 25 to 44; 19.7% were from 45 to 64; and 25.4% were 65 years of age or older. The gender makeup of the city was 48.9% male and 51.1% female.

=== 2000 census ===
As of the census of 2000, there were 220 people, 104 households, and 61 families living in the city. The population density was 562.2 inhabitants per square mile (217.1/km^{2}). There were 118 housing units at an average density of 301.6 per square mile (116.4/km^{2}). The racial makeup of the city was 95.91% White, 0.45% Native American, and 3.64% from two or more races. Hispanic or Latino of any race were 1.36% of the population.

There were 104 households, out of which 25.0% had children under the age of 18 living with them, 48.1% were married couples living together, 8.7% had a female householder with no husband present, and 40.4% were non-families. 40.4% of all households were made up of individuals, and 25.0% had someone living alone who was 65 years of age or older. The average household size was 2.12 and the average family size was 2.82.

In the city the population was spread out, with 24.5% under the age of 18, 5.5% from 18 to 24, 23.2% from 25 to 44, 22.7% from 45 to 64, and 24.1% who were 65 years of age or older. The median age was 43 years. For every 100 females, there were 89.7 males. For every 100 females age 18 and over, there were 78.5 males.

The median income for a household in the city was $29,375, and the median income for a family was $37,250. Males had a median income of $31,250 versus $19,375 for females. The per capita income for the city was $15,182. About 3.4% of families and 6.0% of the population were below the poverty line, including 3.1% of those under the age of eighteen and 16.7% of those 65 or over.

== Notable people ==
- A.M. Carpenter, artist and art educator
- Marion Hedgepeth, thief and outlaw
