= Latham, Missouri =

- Census-designated place
- Location within Missouri Location within the United States
- Coordinates: 38°33′39″N 92°40′57″W
- Country: United States
- State: Missouri
- County: Moniteau

Area
  - Total: 0.39 sq mi (1.00 km^{2})
  - Land: 0.39 sq mi (1.00 km^{2})
  - Water: 0 sq mi (0.00 km^{2})
- Elevation: 896 ft (273 m)

Population (2020)
  - Total: 69
  - Density: 178.9/sq mi (69.09/km^{2})
- ZIP Code: 65050
- FIPS code: 29-40808
- GNIS feature ID: 755554

Latham is an unincorporated community and census-designated place in Moniteau County, Missouri, United States. As of the 2020 census, it had a population of 69.

== History ==
Latham was laid out in 1880. The community has the name of Judge Gardiner Latham, a first settler. A post office called Latham has been in operation since 1892.

== Geography ==
Latham is in southwestern Moniteau County along State Highway E, 10 miles (16 km) southwest of California, Missouri, the county seat. At Latham, there are two antique shops, a post office, a bank, an elementary school, a fire station, a church in-town and another just outside the village limits, and several homes.

According to the U.S. Census Bureau, the Latham CDP has an area of 0.39 square miles (1.01 km^{2}), of which 0.001 square miles (0.003 km^{2}), or 0.26%, are water. The community sits on a small ridge which drains west and north to Smith Creek, a northeast-flowing tributary of North Moreau Creek and part of the Moreau River watershed leading to the Missouri River.

== Demographics ==
Historical population
Census	Pop.	Note	%±
2020	69		—
U.S. Decennial Census

Latham first appeared as a census designated place in the 2020 U.S. census.
