= Corticelli, Missouri =

Unincorporated community in Missouri, US

Coordinates: 38°30′36″N 92°31′29″W

Corticelli is an unincorporated community in Moniteau County, in the U.S. state of Missouri.

== History ==
A post office called Corticelli was established in 1895, and remained in operation until 1911. The community derives its name from a brand of silk thread sold at a local store.
