= Schaaf Creek =

Stream in the U.S. state of Missouri

Schaaf Creek is a stream in Cooper and Moniteau counties of central Missouri.

The stream headwaters arise just south of Prairie Home in eastern Cooper County at 38°48′23″N 92°35′24″W and an elevation of approximately 860 feet. The stream flows south passing through the Prairie Home Conservation Area along the Cooper-Moniteau county line to its confluence with Moniteau Creek just east of the county line at 38°44′39″N 92°34′39″W at an elevation of 594 feet.
