= Dick-Kobel Homestead =

Historic house in Missouri, United States

- U.S. National Register of Historic Places
- Location within Missouri Location within the United States
- Location: W of Jamestown, near Jamestown, Missouri
- Coordinates: 38°44′48″N 92°35′33″W
- Area: less than one acre
- Built: c. 1854, 1901
- Built by: Dick, Adolph, et al.; Kobel, Johannas
- NRHP reference No.: 82003133
- Added to NRHP: September 9, 1982

Dick-Kobel Homestead, also known as the William Kobel Property, is a historic home located near Jamestown, Cooper County, Missouri. It was built about 1854, and is a 1 1/2-story log house constructed of 8 inch by 8 inch hand-hewn horizontal logs. A frame addition and open pent porch were added in 1901. Also on the property is the contributing gable roofed log barn.

It was listed on the National Register of Historic Places in 1982.
