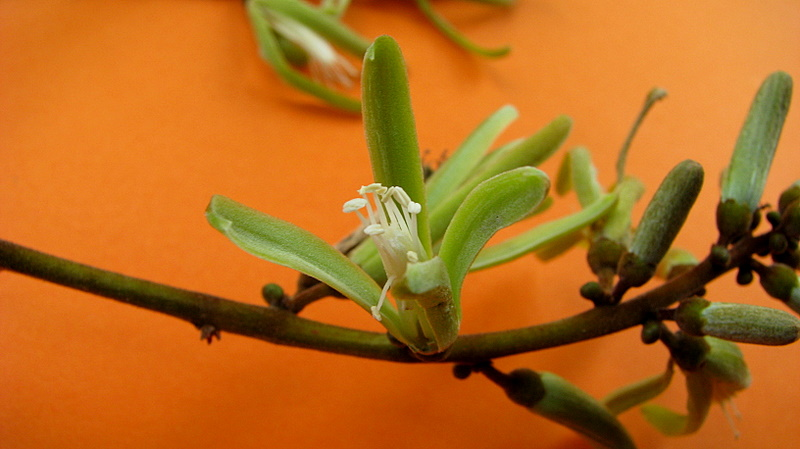
- Simaba cedron

Scientific classification
- Kingdom: Plantae
- Clade: Tracheophytes
- Clade: Angiosperms
- Clade: Eudicots
- Clade: Rosids
- Order: Sapindales
- Family: Simaroubaceae
- Genus: Simaba
- Species: S. cedron

Binomial name
- Simaba cedron Planch.

Synonyms
- Aruba cedron (Planch.) Kuntze; Quassia cedron (Planch.) Baill.

= Simaba cedron =

Species of tree

Simaba cedron, the cedron, is a member of the quassia family, Simaroubaceae, native to Colombia and Central America.
