= Tipton, Missouri =

City in Moniteau County, Missouri, United States

- City
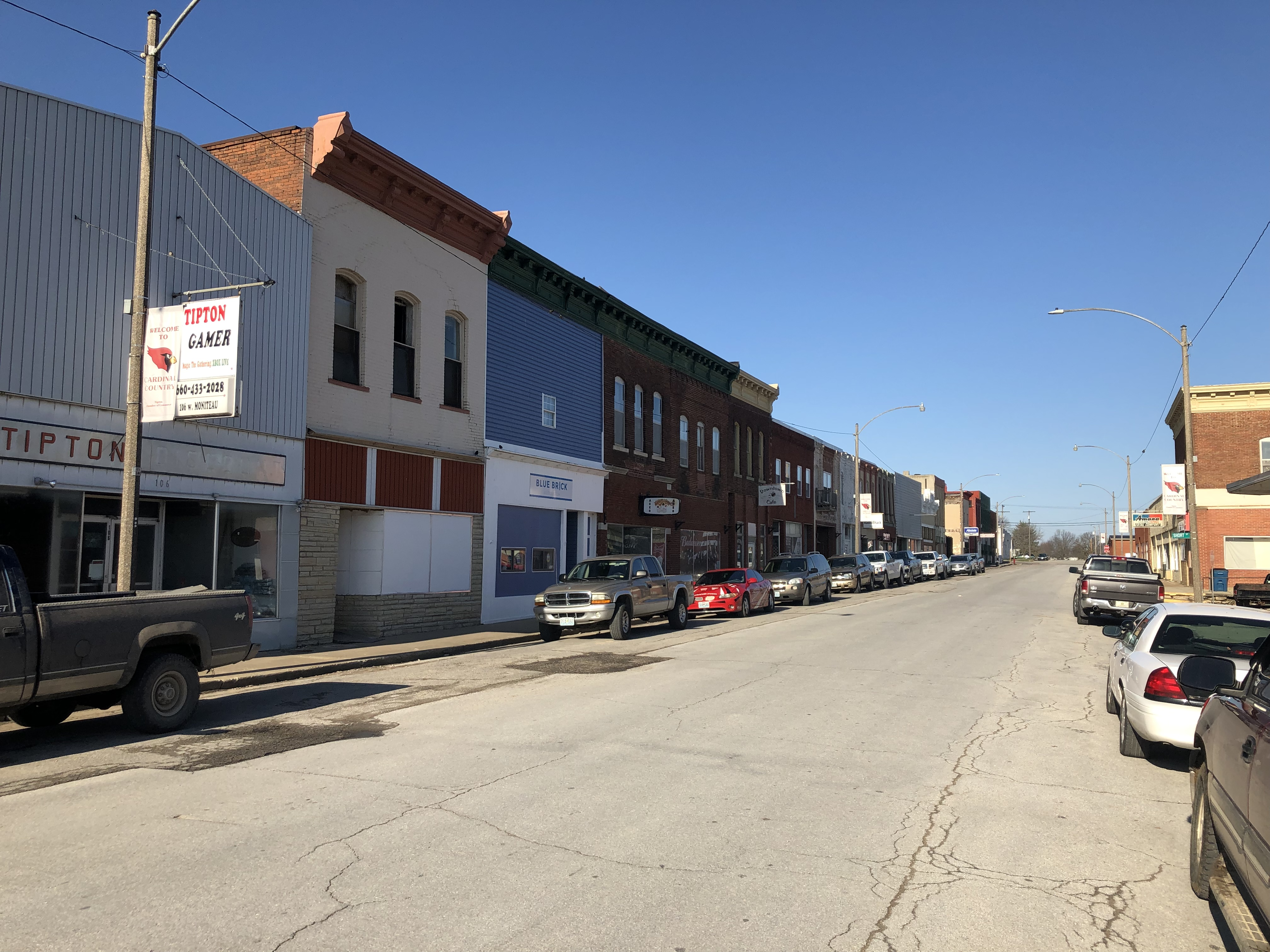
- Downtown Tipton

- Location in Moniteau County and the state of Missouri

- Location in US
- Coordinates: 38°39′18″N 92°46′49″W
- Country: United States
- State: Missouri
- County: Moniteau
- Named after: William Tipton Seely

Government
  - Mayor: Joe Lutz

Area
  - Total: 2.11 sq mi (5.46 km^{2})
  - Land: 2.09 sq mi (5.42 km^{2})
  - Water: 0.019 sq mi (0.05 km^{2})
- Elevation: 929 ft (283 m)

Population (2020)
  - Total: 2,920
  - Density: 1,396/sq mi (539.1/km^{2})
- Time zone: UTC-6 (Central (CST))
  - Summer (DST): UTC-5 (CDT)
- ZIP code: 65081
- Area code: 660
- FIPS code: 29-73420
- GNIS feature ID: 2397030
- Website: www.tiptonmo.us

Tipton is a city in Moniteau County, Missouri, United States. The population was 2,920 as of the 2020 census, down from 3,262 in 2010. It is part of the Jefferson City metropolitan area.

== History ==
Tipton was a predominantly German-American community, in the region known as the Missouri Weinstrasse. Tipton was an eastern terminus of the Butterfield Overland Mail when it was launched in 1858. The route was connected to St. Louis by the Pacific Railroad. Tipton is named for William Tipton Seely, a businessman in nearby Round Hill. He received the land for his service in the War of 1812. From Tipton, a stage went to Fort Smith, Arkansas (where another branch from Memphis also entered). From there, it went on to Los Angeles and San Francisco via a route through southern Arizona and New Mexico. The first run went from Tipton to San Francisco from September 16 to October 10, 1858. The route antedated the Pony Express by two years. The route was designated a national historic trail in 2023. The Maclay Mansion was listed on the National Register of Historic Places in 1979.

== Geography ==
Tipton is located in western Moniteau County at the intersection of U.S. Route 50 and Missouri Route 5. It is 12 miles (19 km) west of California, the Moniteau county seat, and 5 miles (8 km) east of Syracuse in adjacent Morgan County. Versailles is 17 miles (27 km) south on Route 5 in Morgan County.

According to the U.S. Census Bureau, Tipton has a total area of 2.11 square miles (5.46 km^{2}), of which 2.09 square miles (5.41 km^{2}) are land and 0.02 square miles (0.05 km^{2}), or 0.85%, are water. The city is on high ground which drains north to Smiley Creek, which runs northeast to Moniteau Creek; and south towards Willow Fork, which runs east to North Moreau Creek and is part of the Moreau River watershed. Moniteau Creek and the Moreau River each run east to the Missouri River.

== Demographics ==
Historical population
Census	Pop.	Note	%±
1880	989		—
1890	1,253		26.7%
1900	1,337		6.7%
1910	1,273		−4.8%
1920	1,170		−8.1%
1930	1,067		−8.8%
1940	1,219		14.2%
1950	1,234		1.2%
1960	1,639		32.8%
1970	1,914		16.8%
1980	2,155		12.6%
1990	2,026		−6.0%
2000	3,261		61.0%
2010	3,262		0.0%
2020	2,920		−10.5%
U.S. Decennial Census

=== 2020 census ===
As of the 2020 census, Tipton had a population of 2,920. The median age was 39.0 years. 18.8% of residents were under the age of 18 and 15.4% of residents were 65 years of age or older. For every 100 females there were 158.0 males, and for every 100 females age 18 and over there were 173.0 males age 18 and over.

0.0% of residents lived in urban areas, while 100.0% lived in rural areas.

There were 860 households in Tipton, of which 34.0% had children under the age of 18 living in them. Of all households, 46.7% were married-couple households, 16.2% were households with a male householder and no spouse or partner present, and 29.3% were households with a female householder and no spouse or partner present. About 29.3% of all households were made up of individuals and 15.0% had someone living alone who was 65 years of age or older.

There were 981 housing units, of which 12.3% were vacant. The homeowner vacancy rate was 4.6% and the rental vacancy rate was 15.4%.

Racial composition as of the 2020 census
Race	Number	Percent
White	2,538	86.9%
Black or African American	215	7.4%
American Indian and Alaska Native	12	0.4%
Asian	16	0.5%
Native Hawaiian and Other Pacific Islander	6	0.2%
Some other race	21	0.7%
Two or more races	112	3.8%
Hispanic or Latino (of any race)	78	2.7%

=== 2010 census ===
As of the census of 2010, there were 3,262 people, 876 households, and 558 families residing in the city. The population density was 1,560.8 inhabitants per square mile (602.6/km^{2}). There were 999 housing units at an average density of 478.0 per square mile (184.6/km^{2}). The racial makeup of the city was 82.0% White, 16.0% African American, 0.4% Native American, 0.5% Asian, 0.2% from other races, and 0.9% from two or more races. Hispanic or Latino of any race were 1.3% of the population.

There were 876 households, of which 32.3% had children under the age of 18 living with them, 50.9% were married couples living together, 9.4% had a female householder with no husband present, 3.4% had a male householder with no wife present, and 36.3% were non-families. 32.9% of all households were made up of individuals, and 14.9% had someone living alone who was 65 years of age or older. The average household size was 2.34 and the average family size was 2.96.

The median age in the city was 38.4 years. 16.4% of residents were under the age of 18; 7.7% were between the ages of 18 and 24; 37.6% were from 25 to 44; 25.7% were from 45 to 64; and 12.6% were 65 years of age or older. The gender makeup of the city was 65.1% male and 34.9% female.

=== 2000 census ===
As of the census of 2000, there were 3,261 people, 872 households, and 558 families residing in the city. The population density was 1,554.6 inhabitants per square mile (600.2/km^{2}). There were 967 housing units at an average density of 461.0 per square mile (178.0/km^{2}). The racial makeup of the city was 81.51% White, 15.18% African American, 0.95% Native American, 0.43% Asian, 0.03% Pacific Islander, 0.28% from other races, and 1.63% from two or more races. Hispanic or Latino of any race were 0.89% of the population.

There were 872 households, out of which 31.8% had children under the age of 18 living with them, 49.5% were married couples living together, 10.8% had a female householder with no husband present, and 36.0% were non-families. 32.3% of all households were made up of individuals, and 19.5% had someone living alone who was 65 years of age or older. The average household size was 2.33 and the average family size was 2.94.

In the city, the population was spread out, with 16.8% under the age of 18, 7.9% from 18 to 24, 43.5% from 25 to 44, 17.8% from 45 to 64, and 14.0% who were 65 years of age or older. The median age was 37 years. For every 100 females, there were 188.3 males. For every 100 females age 18 and over, there were 215.8 males.

The median income for a household in the city was $32,155, and the median income for a family was $40,486. Males had a median income of $24,509 versus $20,824 for females. The per capita income for the city was $15,987. About 8.7% of families and 10.2% of the population were below the poverty line, including 13.5% of those under age 18 and 10.5% of those age 65 or over.

== Education ==
Public education in Tipton is administered by Tipton R-VI School District.

Tipton has a public library, Price James Memorial Library recognized by the State Library, managed by the Tipton Municipal Library Board established with a voter-approved property tax in 2017. The trustees are appointed by the Mayor of Tipton with approval of the Tipton City Council.

Missouri Training School for Negro Girls, a juvenile correctional facility for black girls operated by the Missouri State Board of Training Schools, was located in Tipton. It opened in 1926 and closed in 1956. It consolidated into the Missouri Training School for Girls in Chillicothe.

== Tipton 8 Ball Water Tower ==
The city of Tipton has a water tower painted like an "eight-ball". The tower originated in 1968, when Ewald Fischer (a native of Tipton) built his billiard table factory—Fischer Manufacturing Co., which claimed to be the largest builder of pool tables in the United States. The company was purchased by the Spalding Company, and the plant closed when Spalding sold it in 1976 to Ebonite Billiard, which was a subsidiary of Fuqua Companies. By then, the water tower was repainted. However, the residents of Tipton wanted to have the eight-ball back, so it was painted again. Today, the water tower is generally regarded as the world's largest eight-ball.

== Notable people ==
- David Koechner, actor
- Gene Clark, musician and songwriter who sang with the New Christy Minstrels, co-founded The Byrds, and was part of the country rock duo Dillard and Clark
- Stella Weiner Kriegshaber (1879–1966), noted pianist
- Gregg Miller, inventor; began his career as a general assignment reporter for the Tipton Times
- Edwin Q. White, journalist; Saigon bureau chief for the Associated Press from 1965 until 1975

== See also ==
- List of cities in Missouri
