= Sandy Hook, Missouri =

Unincorporated community in the US state of Missouri

Coordinates: 38°44′54″N 92°24′31″W

Sandy Hook (also spelled Sandyhook) is an unincorporated community in Moniteau County, in the U.S. state of Missouri. The community is on the southwest bank of the Missouri River floodplain. It lies on Missouri Route 179 between Jamestown to the northwest and Marion to the southeast in Cole County.

A post office called Sandyhook was established in 1902, and remained in operation until 1953. The community was named for the sandbars near the original town site.

Geiger Archeological Site, a prehistoric Native American former settlement, was added to the National Register of Historic Places in 1969.
