= Moniteau Creek (south central Missouri) =

Stream in Missouri, U.S.

Moniteau Creek is a stream in Cooper, Moniteau and Cole counties in central Missouri. It is a tributary of the Missouri River. The stream headwaters are in western Moniteau County just west of Tipton. The stream flows north into Cooper County then turns east and flows through the southeastern part of the county and re-enters Moniteau County. The stream continues meandering east passing under Missouri Route 87 south of Jamestown and enters the Missouri River floodplain in the Marion Bottoms Conservation Area between Sandy Hook to the north and Marion to the south. The confluence with the Missouri River floodplain lies in the northern tip of Cole County.

The stream source is at 38°39′39″N 92°48′14″W and the confluence is at 38°41′25″N 92°21′53″W.

Moniteau Creek derives its name from the Indian term Manitou.

== See also ==
- List of rivers of Missouri
- Tributaries of the Missouri River
