= Moniteau County, Missouri =

County in Missouri, United States

- County
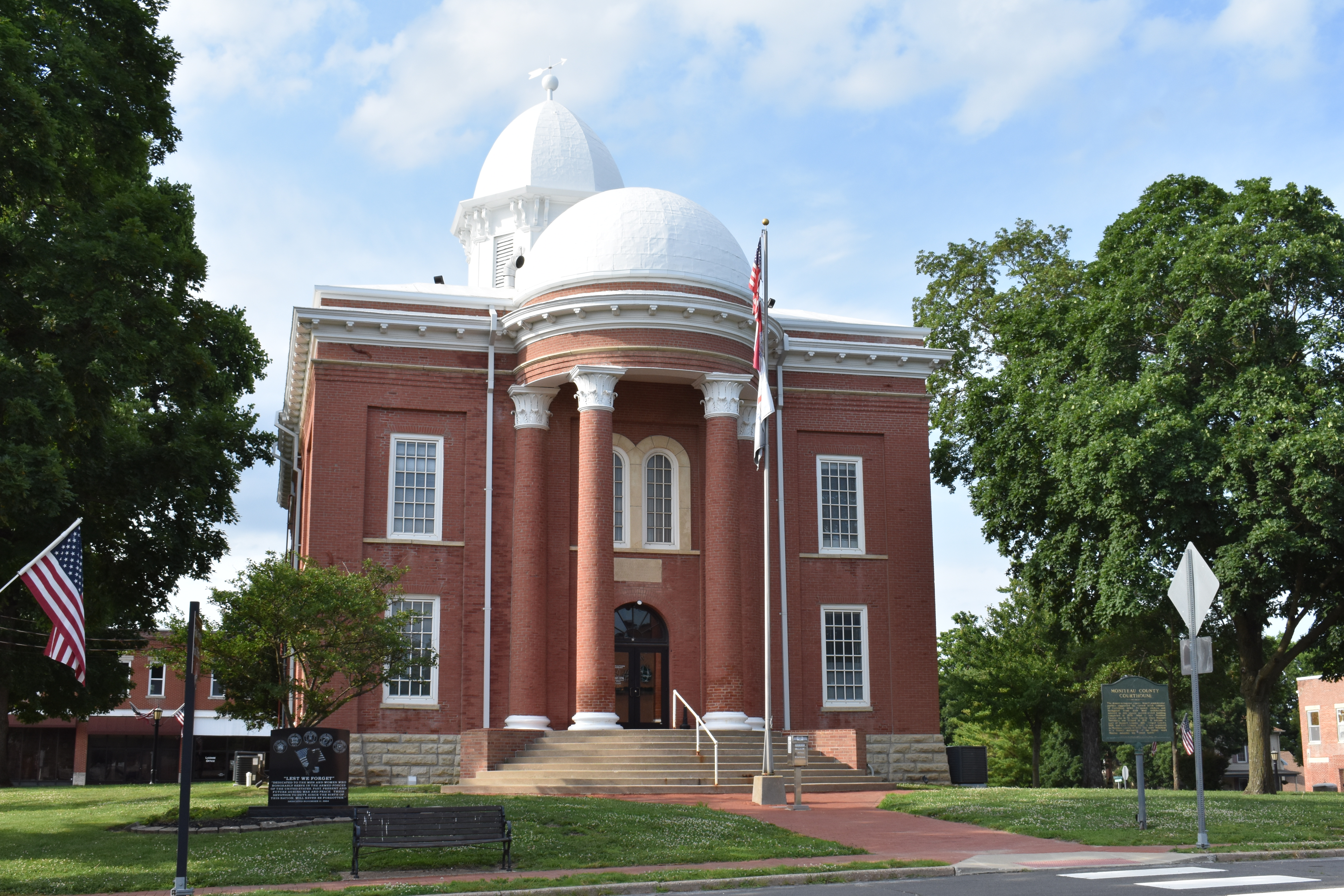
- The Moniteau County Courthouse in California

- Location within the U.S. state of Missouri
- Coordinates: 38°38′N 92°35′W
- Country: United States
- State: Missouri
- Founded: February 14, 1845
- Named for: Moniteau Creek
- Seat: California
- Largest city: California

Area
  - Total: 419 sq mi (1,090 km^{2})
  - Land: 415 sq mi (1,070 km^{2})
  - Water: 3.8 sq mi (9.8 km^{2}) 0.9%

Population (2020)
  - Total: 15,473
  - Estimate (2025): 15,428 ▼
  - Density: 37.3/sq mi (14.4/km^{2})
- Time zone: UTC−6 (Central)
  - Summer (DST): UTC−5 (CDT)
- Congressional district: 3rd

Moniteau County (/ˌmɒnɪˈtɔː/ mon-ih-TAW or /ˈmɒnɪtoʊ/ MON-it-oh) is a county located in the U.S. state of Missouri. As of the 2020 United States census, the population was 15,473. Its county seat is California. The county was organized February 14, 1845, and named for the Moniteau Creek. 'Moniteau' is a French spelling of Manitou, Algonquian for the Great Spirit.

Moniteau County is part of the Jefferson City, Missouri Metropolitan Area.

== Geography ==
According to the U.S. Census Bureau, the county has a total area of 419 square miles (1,090 km^{2}), of which 415 square miles (1,070 km^{2}) is land and 3.8 square miles (9.8 km^{2}) (0.9%) is water.

=== Adjacent counties ===
- Cooper County (northwest)
- Boone County (northeast)
- Cole County (southeast)
- Miller County (south)
- Morgan County (southwest)

=== Major highways ===
- U.S. Route 50
- Route 5
- Route 87
- Route 179

== Demographics ==
Historical population
Census	Pop.	Note	%±
1850	6,004		—
1860	10,124		68.6%
1870	11,375		12.4%
1880	14,346		26.1%
1890	15,630		9.0%
1900	15,931		1.9%
1910	14,375		−9.8%
1920	13,532		−5.9%
1930	12,173		−10.0%
1940	11,775		−3.3%
1950	10,840		−7.9%
1960	10,500		−3.1%
1970	10,742		2.3%
1980	12,068		12.3%
1990	12,298		1.9%
2000	14,827		20.6%
2010	15,607		5.3%
2020	15,473		−0.9%
2025 (est.)	15,428	▼	−0.3%
U.S. Decennial Census; 1790-1960 1900-1990; 1990-2000 2010-2015

=== 2020 census ===
As of the 2020 census, the county had a population of 15,473. The median age was 38.9 years, 25.5% of residents were under the age of 18, and 17.2% were 65 years of age or older. For every 100 females there were 107.6 males, and for every 100 females age 18 and over there were 108.3 males age 18 and over.

There were 5,590 households in the county, of which 33.8% had children under the age of 18 living with them and 22.6% had a female householder with no spouse or partner present. About 26.2% of all households were made up of individuals and 12.7% had someone living alone who was 65 years of age or older.

There were 6,180 housing units, of which 9.5% were vacant. Among occupied housing units, 75.7% were owner-occupied and 24.3% were renter-occupied. The homeowner vacancy rate was 2.0% and the rental vacancy rate was 9.7%.

0.0% of residents lived in urban areas, while 100.0% lived in rural areas.

The racial and ethnic breakdown recorded by the 2020 census is summarized in the table below.

Moniteau County, Missouri – Racial and ethnic composition Note: the US Census treats Hispanic/Latino as an ethnic category. This table excludes Latinos from the racial categories and assigns them to a separate category. Hispanics/Latinos may be of any race.
Race / Ethnicity (NH = Non-Hispanic)	Pop 1980	Pop 1990	Pop 2000	Pop 2010	Pop 2020	% 1980	% 1990	% 2000	% 2010	% 2020
White alone (NH)	11,759	12,006	13,556	14,160	13,688	97.44%	97.63%	91.43%	90.73%	88.46%
Black or African American alone (NH)	211	157	557	580	282	1.75%	1.28%	3.76%	3.72%	1.82%
Native American or Alaska Native alone (NH)	12	51	58	54	40	0.10%	0.41%	0.39%	0.35%	0.26%
Asian alone (NH)	12	36	46	48	42	0.10%	0.29%	0.31%	0.31%	0.27%
Native Hawaiian or Pacific Islander alone (NH)	x	x	2	9	16	x	x	0.01%	0.06%	0.10%
Other race alone (NH)	11	2	2	10	27	0.09%	0.02%	0.01%	0.06%	0.17%
Mixed race or Multiracial (NH)	x	x	171	160	514	x	x	1.15%	1.03%	3.32%
Hispanic or Latino (any race)	63	46	435	586	864	0.52%	0.37%	2.93%	3.75%	5.58%
Total	12,068	12,298	14,827	15,607	15,473	100.00%	100.00%	100.00%	100.00%	100.00%

=== 2000 census ===
As of the 2000 census, there were 14,827 people, 5,259 households, and 3,728 families residing in the county. The population density was 36 inhabitants per square mile (14/km^{2}). There were 5,742 housing units at an average density of 14 units per square mile (5.4/km^{2}). The racial makeup of the county was 92.75% White, 3.78% Black or African American, 0.40% Native American, 0.31% Asian, 0.01% Pacific Islander, 1.48% from other races, and 1.27% from two or more races. Approximately 2.93% of the population were Hispanic or Latino of any race. 35.8% were of German, 20.5% American, 8.2% English, and 7.0% Irish ancestry.

There were 5,259 households, out of which 35.30% had children under the age of 18 living with them, 58.00% were married couples living together, 8.60% had a female householder with no husband present, and 29.10% were non-families. 25.60% of all households were made up of individuals, and 13.00% had someone living alone who was 65 years of age or older. The average household size was 2.56 and the average family size was 3.07.

In the county, the population was spread out, with 25.90% under the age of 18, 8.20% from 18 to 24, 31.10% from 25 to 44, 20.90% from 45 to 64, and 13.90% who were 65 years of age or older. The median age was 36 years. For every 100 females, there were 113.30 males. For every 100 females age 18 and over, there were 116.80 males.

The median income for a household in the county was $37,168, and the median income for a family was $42,487. Males had a median income of $26,807 versus $20,853 for females. The per capita income for the county was $16,609. About 7.30% of families and 9.90% of the population were below the poverty line, including 13.10% of those under age 18 and 9.00% of those age 65 or over.

== Education ==
=== Public schools ===
- Clarksburg C-2 School District – Clarksburg
  - Clarksburg Elementary School (K-08)
- High Point R-III School District – High Point
  - High Point Elementary School (K-08)
- Jamestown C-1 School District – Jamestown
  - Jamestown Elementary School (PK-06)
  - Jamestown High School (07-12)
- Moniteau County R-I School District – California
  - California Elementary School (PK-05)
  - California Middle School (06-08)
  - California High School (09-12)
- Moniteau County R-V School District – Latham
  - Moniteau County Elementary School (K-08)
- Tipton R-VI School District – Tipton
  - Tipton Elementary School (PK-06)
  - Tipton High School (07-12)

=== Private schools ===
- California Christian Academy – California (02-07) – Nondenominational Christian
- Hazel Dell School – Latham (02-09) – Mennonite
- Prairie Union School – Latham (02-09) – Mennonite
- South Latham School – Latham (01-08) – Mennonite
- St. Andrew School – Tipton (K-09) – Roman Catholic

=== Public libraries ===
- Moniteau County @ Wood Place Library
- Price James Memorial Library

== Communities ==
=== Cities and towns ===
- California (county seat)
- Clarksburg
- Jamestown
- Lupus
- Tipton

=== Census-designated places ===
- Fortuna
- Latham

=== Unincorporated communities ===
- Bacon
- Cedron
- Corticelli
- Enon
- High Point
- Kliever
- McGirk
- Renfro
- Sandy Hook

== Politics ==
=== Local ===
The Republican Party predominantly controls politics at the local level in Moniteau County. Republicans currently hold all but one of the elected positions in the county.

Moniteau County, Missouri

Elected countywide officials
Assessor	Melissa Hentges	Republican
Circuit Clerk	Michele A. Higgins	Republican
County Clerk	Roberta Elliott	Republican
Collector	Ellen Ash	Republican
Commissioner (presiding)	Kenneth Kunze	Republican
Commissioner (district 1)	Tony Barry	Republican
Commissioner (district 2)	Greg Robinson	Republican
Coroner	Loyd Fulks	Republican
Prosecuting Attorney	Mary Kay Lutz	Republican
Public Administrator	Cher King Caudel	Republican
Recorder	Michele A. Higgins	Republican
Sheriff	Tony Wheatley	Republican
Surveyor	Joseph Bax	Democratic
Treasurer	Sarah B. Jones	Republican

=== State ===
Past Gubernatorial Elections Results
Year	Republican	Democratic	Third Parties
2024	81.27% 5,879	16.09% 1,164	2.64% 191
2020	80.87% 5,784	17.30% 1,237	1.83% 131
2016	64.06% 4,351	33.22% 2,256	2.72% 185
2012	55.65% 3,568	41.32% 2,649	3.03% 194
2008	54.25% 3,617	44.26% 2,951	1.48% 99
2004	66.81% 4,480	32.48% 2,178	0.71% 48
2000	53.09% 3,217	44.38% 2,689	2.52% 153
1996	36.16% 1,973	61.22% 3,340	2.62% 143

Moniteau County is split between two of the districts that elect members of the Missouri House of Representatives; both of which elected Republicans, although one seat is currently vacant.

- District 50 — (Currently vacant.) Consists of the communities of California, Jamestown, and Lupus.

Missouri House of Representatives — District 50 — Moniteau County (2016)
Party	Candidate	Votes	%	±%
Republican	Caleb Jones	2,812	100.00%	

Missouri House of Representatives — District 50 — Moniteau County (2014)
Party	Candidate	Votes	%	±%
Republican	Caleb Jones	1,470	100.00%	

Missouri House of Representatives — District 50 — Moniteau County (2012)
Party	Candidate	Votes	%	±%
Republican	Caleb Jones	2,633	100.00%	

- District 58 — David Wood (R-Versailles). Consists of the communities of Clarksburg, Fortuna, High Point, Latham, and Tipton.

Missouri House of Representatives — District 58 — Moniteau County (2016)
Party	Candidate	Votes	%	±%
Republican	David Wood	2,872	83.71%	−16.29
Democratic	Travis Maupin	559	16.29%	+16.29

Missouri House of Representatives — District 58 — Moniteau County (2014)
Party	Candidate	Votes	%	±%
Republican	David Wood	1,537	100.00%	

Missouri House of Representatives — District 58 — Moniteau County (2012)
Party	Candidate	Votes	%	±%
Republican	David Wood	2,842	100.00%	

All of Moniteau County is a part of Missouri's 6th District in the Missouri Senate and is currently represented by Mike Kehoe (R-Jefferson City).

Missouri Senate — District 6 — Moniteau County (2014)
Party	Candidate	Votes	%	±%
Republican	Mike Kehoe	2,796	81.75%	
Democratic	Mollie Kristen Fairbairn	624	18.25%	

=== Federal ===
U.S. Senate — Missouri — Moniteau County (2016)
Party	Candidate	Votes	%	±%
Republican	Roy Blunt	4,431	65.29%	+10.49
Democratic	Jason Kander	2,097	30.90%	−6.76
Libertarian	Jonathan Dine	143	2.11%	−5.43
Green	Johnathan McFarland	56	0.83%	+0.83
Constitution	Fred Ryman	60	0.88%	+0.88

U.S. Senate — Missouri — Moniteau County (2012)
Party	Candidate	Votes	%	±%
Republican	Todd Akin	3,483	54.80%	
Democratic	Claire McCaskill	2,394	37.66%	
Libertarian	Jonathan Dine	479	7.54%	

All of Moniteau County is included in Missouri's 3rd congressional district and is currently represented by Blaine Luetkemeyer (R-St. Elizabeth) in the U.S. House of Representatives.

U.S. House of Representatives — Missouri’s 4th Congressional District — Moniteau County (2016)
Party	Candidate	Votes	%	±%
Republican	Vicky Hartzler	5,161	77.38%	+1.58
Democratic	Gordon Christensen	1,272	19.07%	+0.71
Libertarian	Mark Bliss	237	3.55%	−2.29

U.S. House of Representatives — Missouri's 4th Congressional District — Moniteau County (2014)
Party	Candidate	Votes	%	±%
Republican	Vicky Hartzler	2,596	75.80%	+6.45
Democratic	Nate Irvin	629	18.36%	−9.16
Libertarian	Herschel L. Young	200	5.84%	+3.46

U.S. House of Representatives — Missouri's 4th Congressional District — Moniteau County (2012)
Party	Candidate	Votes	%	±%
Republican	Vicky Hartzler	4,368	69.35%	
Democratic	Teresa Hensley	1,733	27.52%	
Libertarian	Thomas Holbrook	150	2.38%	
Constitution	Greg Cowan	47	0.75%	

==== Political culture ====
The county leans heavily Republican in presidential elections and has not voted for a Democratic candidate since 1948 - when Harry S. Truman (a Missouri native) was elected to a term in his own right.

United States presidential election results for Moniteau County, Missouri
Year	Republican		Democratic		Third party(ies)	
Year	No.	%	No.	%	No.	%
1888	1,448	43.87%	1,436	43.50%	417	12.63%
1892	1,326	39.82%	1,340	40.24%	664	19.94%
1896	1,580	42.62%	2,096	56.54%	31	0.84%
1900	1,684	45.05%	1,876	50.19%	178	4.76%
1904	1,756	47.78%	1,763	47.97%	156	4.24%
1908	1,691	47.63%	1,763	49.66%	96	2.70%
1912	1,375	41.59%	1,612	48.76%	319	9.65%
1916	1,748	50.29%	1,675	48.19%	53	1.52%
1920	3,535	58.98%	2,405	40.12%	54	0.90%
1924	3,138	53.17%	2,601	44.07%	163	2.76%
1928	3,496	59.87%	2,310	39.56%	33	0.57%
1932	2,331	38.13%	3,767	61.61%	16	0.26%
1936	3,238	50.08%	3,210	49.64%	18	0.28%
1940	3,627	55.32%	2,922	44.57%	7	0.11%
1944	3,237	58.04%	2,327	41.72%	13	0.23%
1948	2,594	48.17%	2,787	51.75%	4	0.07%
1952	3,658	60.15%	2,416	39.73%	7	0.12%
1956	3,239	55.93%	2,552	44.07%	0	0.00%
1960	3,453	60.32%	2,271	39.68%	0	0.00%
1964	2,758	51.24%	2,624	48.76%	0	0.00%
1968	3,210	58.54%	1,687	30.77%	586	10.69%
1972	3,963	73.96%	1,395	26.04%	0	0.00%
1976	3,077	55.39%	2,462	44.32%	16	0.29%
1980	3,430	58.79%	2,284	39.15%	120	2.06%
1984	4,197	72.23%	1,614	27.77%	0	0.00%
1988	3,502	64.30%	1,936	35.55%	8	0.15%
1992	2,566	42.15%	2,018	33.15%	1,504	24.70%
1996	2,603	47.63%	2,129	38.96%	733	13.41%
2000	3,764	62.06%	2,176	35.88%	125	2.06%
2004	4,743	70.89%	1,913	28.59%	35	0.52%
2008	4,467	67.02%	2,084	31.27%	114	1.71%
2012	4,704	73.01%	1,608	24.96%	131	2.03%
2016	5,347	78.29%	1,237	18.11%	246	3.60%
2020	5,744	80.26%	1,308	18.28%	105	1.47%
2024	5,877	80.78%	1,313	18.05%	85	1.17%

== See also ==
- National Register of Historic Places listings in Moniteau County, Missouri
